= 1919 New Year Honours (DCM) =

The 1919 New Year Honours were appointments by lord George V to various orders and honours to reward and highlight good works by citizens of the British Empire. The appointments were published in The London Gazette and The Times in January 1919.

== Distinguished Conduct Medal (DCM) ==
For distinguished service in connection with Military Operations with the Armies in Salonika:

- Battery Sergeant Major S. A. Long, C/114th Brigade, Royal Field Artillery (Manor Park)
- Sergeant R. J. Wildman, 9th S. Battalion, Royal Lancaster Regiment (Lancaster)

For distinguished services in connection with Military Operations with the British Forces in Egypt:

- Company Sergeant Major E. Addicott, 3rd Battalion, Royal Berkshire Regiment, attd. 1st British West Indies Regiment (Halland)
- Signaller Corporal H. Armour, 18th Brigade, Royal Horse Artillery (Ayr)
- Sergeant W. J. Barnes, 85th Field Company, Royal Engineers (Dublin)
- Sergeant M. E. Barrett, 1/B. Battery, Honourable Artillery Company, attd. 19th Brigade, Royal Horse Artillery (U. Clapton, London)
- Driver P. R. Beart, 54th Division, Royal Army Service Corps (Willesden Gn.)
- Sergeant F. Bloomfield, 1/4th Battalion, Norfolk Regiment (Thetford)
- Sergeant A. E. Bolt, No. 8 Company, Imperial Camel Corps (Weymouth)
- Driver M. Burke, 1/3rd (Lowland) Brigade, Royal Field Artillery, attd. B. Battery, 262nd Brigade, Royal Field Artillery (Glasgow)
- Sergeant Major B. Clark, 8th Battalion, Hampshire Regiment (Sandown)
- Sergeant R. Clark, 1/5th Battalion, Suffolk Regiment (Cavendish, Suff.)
- Company Sergeant Major G. Clement, 1st Battalion, North Staffordshire Regiment, attd. 2nd Battalion, British West Indies Regiment (Nordon)
- Corporal R. T. Coles, Royal Engineers, attd. 20th Indian Infantry Brigade Sub-Sec. (Ampthill)
- Corporal T. S. Crawford, 96th Lieutenant Railway Company, Royal Engineers (Walpole, Norfolk)
- Battery Quartermaster Sergeant A. W. Davies, 1/4th Battalion Essex Regiment (Plaistow)
- Sergeant J. A. Denman, Nottinghamshire Yeomanry (Retford)
- Corporal A. Drury, 1/5th Battalion, Essex Regiment (Castle Hedingham)
- Private R. Dunn, No. 7 Company, Imperial Camel Corps (Dundee)
- Sergeant W. Dunne, 1st Battalion, Royal Irish Regiment (Dublin)
- Sergeant T. Field, 1/5th Battalion, Somerset Light Infantry (Taunton)
- Sergeant E. H. Forster, Royal Army Medical Corps, attd. 154th Indian Com. Field Ambulance (Weaste, Salford)
- Sergeant C. H. Foster, 1/5th Battalion, Welsh Regiment (Bedlinog, via Cardiff)
- Corporal J. Freeman, No. 10 Company, Imperial Camel Corps (Hull)
- Private E. French, Royal Army Veterinary Corps, attd. 1/1st (Somerset) Royal Horse Artillery (West Porlock)
- Farrier Quartermaster/Sergeant T. H. Gabb, Gloucestershire Yeomanry (Gloucester)
- Company Sergeant Major A. W. Gibbs, 1/10th Battalion, London Regiment (Stamford Hill)
- Battery Sergeant Major H. B. Goddard, 2/67th Divisional Ammunition Column, Royal Field Artillery (Eastleigh)
- Corporal D. Grant, 98th Lieutenant Railway Company, Royal Engineers (Avermore, Inverness)
- Lance Corporal W. V. Greening, No. 8 Company, Imperial Camel Corps (Southampton)
- Sergeant K. Grimes, 91st Heavy Battery, Royal Garrison Artillery (Cricklewood)
- Corporal J. G. Groom, 13th Pont. Park, Royal Engineers (Middlesbotrough)
- Corporal R. Hallows, 67th Brigade, Royal Field Artillery (Liverpool)
- Sergeant P. W. Hammond, 1/1st Dorsetshire Yeomanry (Dorchester)
- Fitter Staff Sergeant E. P. Hawks, 304th Siege Battery, Royal Garrison Artillery (Westminster)
- Sergeant A. W. Hermon, No. 8 Company, Imperial Camel Corps (Reading)
- Sergeant W. F. Hethershaw, Nottinghamshire Yeomanry (Retford)
- Sapper J. K. Higgins, Royal Engineers (Shettleston)
- Staff Sergeant Major E. Hope, 19th Machine Gun Squadron, Cavalry Machine Gun Corps (Brighton)
- Battery Sergeant Major J. Humphries, 1/2nd (Herts.) Battery, Royal Field Artillery, attd. A. Battery, 270th Brigade, Royal Field Artillery (Watford)
- Sergeant W. J. Inman, 3rd Battalion, Royal Berkshire Regiment, attd. 2nd Battalion, British West Indies Regiment (Reading)
- Company Sergeant Major F. James, 1/5tfh Battalion, Essex Regiment (South Twickenham)
- Private T. James, 2nd Battalion, Royal Highlanders (Edmondsley)
- Sergeant C. E. Jeffries, 119th A. Air Section, Royal Garrison Artillery (Tunbridge Wells)
- Sergeant L. F. Kerswell, 11th Cavalry Brigade, Signal Troop, Royal Engineers (Brondesbury Bark)
- Corporal G. T. Knight, 1/5th Battalion, Somerset Light Infantry (Highbridge)
- Sergeant V. L. Lamplugh, No. 8 Company, Imperial Camel Corps (Hull)
- Sergeant W. H. Langlois, 2/19th Battalion, London Regiment (Kensal Rise)
- Sergeant T. Leadbetter, 54th Division, Machine Gun Battalion (Smethwick)
- Company Sergeant Major C. H. Leake, 1/5th Battalion, Norfolk Regiment (East Runton)
- Sergeant H. Letts, 1/4th Battalion, Northamptonshire Regiment (Rushden)
- Private T. Lewis, 2nd Battalion, Leicestershire Regiment (Leicester)
- Sergeant A. D. Lindsay, 390th Battery, 37th Brigade, Royal Field Artillery (East Ham)
- Company Sergeant Major T. Lloyd, 436th Field Company, Royal Engineers T.F. (Llanelly)
- Lance Corporal C. Lye, 1/1st Dorsetshire Yeomanry (Trowbridge)
- Corporal W. McEvoy, 3/4th (West Lancaster) How. Brigade, Royal Field Artillery, attd. No. 5 M.M. Battery. (Putney, London)
- Private D. McWalter, 2/1st (Ang.) Field Ambulance, Royal Army Medical Corps (Dundee)
- Corporal H. J. Mead, 521st Field Company, Royal Engineers (Battersea)
- Sergeant J. T. Milliard, 1/1st Staffordshire Yeomanry (Brockmoor, Staffs.)
- Regimental Sergeant Major A. Morgan, 12th Lancers, attd. 1/5th Battalion, Royal Welsh Fusiliers (Dumfries)
- Sergeant T. G. Morgan, 2nd Battalion, HQ Company, Imperial Camel Corps (Pembroke)
- Lance Corporal H. Morns, 54th Division Machine Gun Battalion (Paddington)
- Lance Sergeant W. A. Murray, No. 7 Company, Imperial Camel Corps (Prestwick)
- Sapper J. Nicol, 521st Field Company, Royal Engineers (U. Kennington Lane)
- Signaller Corporal R. Old, 406th Battery, 172nd Brigade, Royal Field Artillery (Farnborough, Hampshire.)
- Sapper A. Ottoway, 7th Field Survey Company, Royal Engineers (Hildenborougth)
- Battery Sergeant Major W. Parker, No. 2 Section, 53rd Divisional Ammunition Column, Royal Field Artillery (Sheffield)
- Fitter Staff Sergeant G. A. Phillipson, 1/1st (Essex) Battery, Royal Field Artillery, attd. A. Battery, 271st Brigade, Royal Field Artillery (Manor Park)
- Battery Sergeant Major H. G. Pollard, A. Battery, 265th Brigade, Royal Field Artillery (Chester)
- Sergeant W. E. Pratt, 1/6th Battalion, Essex Regiment, attd. 161st Light Trench Mortar Battery (Plaistow)
- Bombardier P. Quinnell, Royal Field Artillery, attd. No. 5 M.M. Battery. (Rainham)
- Sapper J. Richardson, 7th Field Survey Company, Royal Engineers (Wealdstone, Harrow)
- Company Sergeant Major A. Gr. Ricketts, 2nd Battalion, Dorsetshire Regiment (Yeovil)
- Private J. Rochford, 1st Battalion, Connaught Rangers (Clare)
- Sergeant S. Rose, 10th Signal Company, Royal Engineers (Limerick)
- Sergeant G. A. Ross, Royal Engineers Cable Section, Royal Engineers (Sidmouth June.)
- Sergeant J. Ross, 1/3rd (Lowland) Brigade, Royal Field Artillery, attd. A. Battery, 262nd Brigade, Royal Field Artillery (Clydebank)
- Private C. Ryder, 75th Division, Machine Gun Battalion (Barrowford)
- Battery Quartermaster Sergeant L. Schwarz, 5/6th Battalion, Royal Welsh Fusiliers (Holywell)
- Sergeant T. G. Shepherd, 2/22nd Battalion, London Regiment (Bermondsey)
- Battery Sergeant Major J. Shields, Royal Field Artillery, attd. A. Battery, 302nd Brigade, Royal Field Artillery (Kirkcaldy)
- Sergeant W. E. S. Taylor, 1/2nd (South Midland) Mounted Brigade, Field Ambulance, Royal Army Medical Corps, attd. 10th Cavalry Brigade, Com. Field Ambulance (Stony Stratford)
- Sergeant J. H. Vaughan, 53rd Machine Gun Battalion (Welshpool)
- Private C. H. Wakeman, King's Royal Rifle Corps, posted 2/13th Battalion, London Regiment (Nutfield)
- Corporal F. J. Watts, No. 6 (Pack) Wireless Sec., Royal Engineers (Finchley)
- Corporal A. W. Western, 2/22nd Battalion, London Regiment, attd. 181st Light Trench Mortar Battery (New Cross)
- Company Sergeant Major W. H. Williams, 437th Field Company, Royal Engineers (E. Griffithstown)
- Private E. Wise, 1/1st Nottinghamshire Yeomanry (Poplar, London)
- Sergeant H. V. Wodhams, 75th Battery, 263rd Brigade, Royal Field Artillery (Freshwater)
- Sergeant W. C. Worthing, 1/1st Battalion, Herefordshire Regiment (Rhayader)
- Sapper T. W. Yardy, 96th Lieutenant Railway Company, Royal Engineers (Knobtingley)
- Sergeant J. E. Yates, 54th Divisional Signals Company, Royal Engineers

Australian Imperial Force

- Sergeant F. J. Allen, 2nd Australian Light Horse Regiment
- Signaller A. Baldwin, 2nd Australian Light Horse Regiment
- Lance Corporal F. Bell, D Trps. and Bdg. Trn., Australian Engineers
- Lance Corporal S. E. Broad, 3rd Australian Machine Gun Squadron
- Trooper J. Brunton, 12th Australian Light Horse Regiment
- Sergeant J. E. Chapman, Sth Australian Light Horse Regiment
- Farrier Quartermaster/Sergeant A. W. Cook. 5th Australian Light Horse Regiment
- Lance Corporal C. W. S. Cooper, 11th Australian Light Horse Regiment
- Sergeant J. Fitzmaurice, 10th Australian Light Horse Regiment
- Corporal W. Gray, 3rd Australian Light Horse Regiment
- Corporal R. E. Haseler, 14th Australian Light Horse Regiment
- Sergeant F. A. Kolosque, 4th Australian Machine Gun Squadron
- Lance Corporal W. J. Langdon, 10th Australian Light Horse Regiment
- Signaller S. McCallum, 14th Australian Light Horse Regiment
- Staff Sergeant Major L. W. McDonald, 1st Field Squadron Australian Engineers
- Lance Corporal H. R. Y. McGuigan, 1st Field Squadron, Australian Engineers
- Signaller Sergeant E. E. McHugh, 4th Australian Light Horse Regiment
- Private G. B. G. Maitland, 4th Australian Light Horse Regiment
- Sergeant W. C. Martin, 10th Australian Light Horse Regiment
- Sergeant H. E. Monaghan, 1st Field Squadron, Australian Engineers
- Staff Sergeant L. A. Patterson, Australian Mounted Division Trn
- Corporal A. P. Pearson, Australian Light Horse Details
- Staff Sergeant Major T. L. Pringle, Australian and New Zealand Mounted Division
- Corporal H. E. Runn, 9th Australian Light Horse Regiment
- Staff Sergeant Major P. P. Sheridan, 6th Australian Light Horse Regiment
- Corporal W. A. G. Smith, 7th Australian Light Horse Regiment
- Lance Corporal W. W. Willis, 8th Australian Light Horse Regiment

New Zealand Force

- Sergeant L. Burrows, Canterbury Mounted Rifles Regiment

South African Force

- Regimental Sergeant Major W. Baker, 1st South African Field Artillery Brigade

In recognition of valuable services rendered with the British Forces in Italy:

- Company Sergeant Major J. Ashworth MM 24th Battalion (P), Manchester Regiment (Oldham)
- Company Sergeant Major J. Betts, 11th Battalion, Nottinghamshire and Derbyshire Regiment (Burton-on-Trent)
- Private G. Brayley, 8th Battalion, Devonshire Regiment (S. Molton, Devon)
- Sergeant F. E. Brumell, 19th Heavy Battery, Royal Garrison Artillery (Belvedere)
- Sergeant F. Cattell, 1/7th Battalion, Royal Warwickshire Regiment (Leamington Spa)
- Company Sergeant Major A. Clarke, 2nd Battalion, Royal Warwickshire Regiment (Warwick)
- Sergeant J. J. Cosnett, 105th Battery, 22nd Brigade, Royal Field Artillery (Solihull, Birmingham)
- Private J. H. Cox, 9th Battalion, South Staffordshire Regiment (Walsall)
- Company Sergeant Major G. E. Dent, 8th Battalion, Yorkshire Regiment (Sheffield)
- Gunner R. W. Donnan, B Battery, 102nd Brigade, Royal Field Artillery (Castlebellingham)
- Sergeant R. Everson MM 10th Battalion, West Riding Regiment (Shipley)
- Company Sergeant Major J. Goodieson, 9th Battalion, Yorkshire Regiment (Middlesbrough)
- Sergeant A. Hamilton, 7th Battalion, Machine Gun Corps (Motberwell)
- Bombardier B. Hawkeswood, C Battery, 241st (South Midland) Brigade, Royal Field Artillery (Kedditch)
- Lance Bombardier R. Hunt, 155th Heavy Battery, Royal Garrison Artillery (Stockport)
- Battery Sergeant Major C. Jarman, D Battery, 103rd Brigade, Royal Field Artillery (E. Chatham)
- Company Sergeant Major A. H. Laidler, 1/4th Battalion, Royal Berkshire Regiment (Newbury)
- Sergeant W. Longmore, 1/6th Battalion, Royal Warwickshire Regiment (Birmingham)
- Private C. Oliver, 23rd Division MT. Company, Royal Army Service Corps, attd. 69th Field Ambulance Royal Army Medical Corps (Potters Bar)
- Corporal A. J. Oyler, 5th Battalion (P), Royal Sussex Regiment (Rye)
- Private H. G. A. Pike, 1/5th Battalion, Gloucestershire Regiment (Cheltenham)
- Gunner G. Reddick, A. Battery, 103rd Brigade, Royal Field Artillery (Leatherhead)
- Regimental Sergeant Major A. Robson MC 8th Battalion, Yorkshire Regiment (Seaton)
- Corporal F. H. S. Royals, 1/7th Battalion, Worcestershire Regiment (Kidderminster)
- Lance Corporal T. F. Salmon, 2nd Battalion, Royal West Surrey Regiment (Southwark Bridge Road, London)
- Private W. Shepherd, 2nd Battalion, Gordon Highlanders (Oakley)
- Private J. Southall, 1st Battalion, South Staffordshire Regiment (Dudley)
- Sergeant W. J. Treadwell, 289tli Siege Battery, Royal Garrison Artillery (Lightborne, near Warwick)
- Sapper P. Tunnicliff, 6th Field Sur. Company, Royal Engineers (Coventry)
- Sergeant J. S. Wright, 1/1st (War.) Heavy Battery, Royal Garrison Artillery (Birmingham)

In recognition of valuable services rendered with the British Forces in Italy:

- Gunner H. Aitken, Royal Field Artillery, attd. 102nd Brigade (Stranraer)
- Private O. E. R. Alexander, Honourable Artillery Company, 2nd Battalion (Stoke-on-Trent)
- Private W. Allan, Royal Army Service Corps, 3rd Corps F.S.C. (Kilmarnock),
- Company Quartermaster Sergeant A. Allen, Worcestershire Regiment, 8th Battalion (Worcester)
- Sergeant C. Atkinson, Royal Engineers, 5 Pontoon Park (Blackburn)
- 2nd Corporal J. Austin, Royal Engineers, 5 Pontoon Park (Ladywood)
- Bombardier R. Bacon, Royal Field Artillery, B/102nd Brigade (Buxton)
- Sergeant W. Baker, Royal Field Artillery, 48th Divisional Artillery Column (Bristol.)
- Sergeant H. J. Bannister, Royal Sussex Regiment, 5th Battalion (Rye)
- Sergeant Major W. J. Barber, Manchester Regiment, 21st Battalion (London)
- Private A. Barker, Royal Army Service Corps, 14th Corps, FS.C. (Rochester)
- Sergeant R. Batey, Royal Field Artillery, 58th Battery (Silvertown, TP)
- Sergeant G. Beateon, Royal Garrison Artillery, Horse Artillery (E. Leeds)
- Company Quartermaster Sergeant M.C. Bell, York & Lancaster Regiment, 8th Battalion (Sacriston)
- Private W. Bell, Manchester Regiment, 20th Battalion (Stockport)
- Sergeant S. G. Bennett, East Kent Regiment, 7th Battalion (Finsbury Park)
- Quartermaster Sergeant W. J. Benning, Oxfordshire & Buckinghamshire Light Infantry, 1st Buckinghamshire Battalion (Cheshain)
- Sergeant C. Blackwell, Royal Warwickshire Regiment, 5th Battalion (Bromsgrove)
- Private J. S. Bolam, Northumberland Fusiliers, 11th Battalion (Newcastle upon Tyne)
- Corporal W. Bostock, Royal Engineers, Signal Company (Hanley)
- Corporal D. W. Bowen, Royal Army Service Corps, Headquarters, 23rd Division (Carmarthen)
- Company Quartermaster Sergeant F. J. Boyce, West Yorkshire Regiment, 11th Battalion (Sheffield)
- Sapper W. Brennan, Royal Engineers, 54th Field Company (Woolwich)
- Sergeant J. T. Bridges, Royal Engineers, L. of C. Signal Company (Gillingham)
- Company Quartermaster Sergeant R. Brown, Border Regiment, 2nd Battalion (Oreston)
- Corporal R. Browning, Royal Sussex Regiment, 5th Battalion (East Grinstead)
- Colour Sergeant F. B. J. Buck, Machine Gun Corps, 7th Battalion (Waterfoot)
- Quartermaster Sergeant E. H. Buhner, Nottinghamshire and Derbyshire Regiment, 11th Battalion (Fleetwood)
- Sergeant G. E. J. Bushnell, Royal Army Medical Corps, 71st Field Ambulance (Chelsea)
- Sergeant H. Butler, Royal Engineers, Signal Company (Reading)
- Sergeant A. Cadd MM Royal Field Artillery, attd. 103rd Brigade (Glodwick)
- Fitter F. J. Calvert, Royal Garrison Artillery, 293rd Siege Battery (Southend-on-Sea)
- Corporal W. Campbell, Gloucestershire Regiment, 6th Battalion (Bristol)
- Quartermaster Sergeant R. A. Campbell, Manchester Regiment, 20th Battalion (Manchester)
- Private W. C. Cannon, Royal Fusiliers (London),
- Company Sergeant Major M. Capelen DCM Royal Welsh Fusiliers, 1st Battalion (Wrexham)
- Corporal E. J. W. Champion, Royal Army Medical Corps, 3rd (S Mid.) Field Ambulance (Poole)
- Private S. C. Chant, Royal Army Service Corps, Headquarters, 4th Corps (Martock),
- Driver T. Cheesmore, Royal Engineers, 7th D.S. Company (Pensnurst)
- Company Sergeant Major J. A. Christie, Machine Gun Corps, 7th Battalion (Aberdeen)
- Company Quartermaster Sergeant G. Claytor, Nottinghamshire and Derbyshire Regiment, 11th Battalion (Chesterfield)
- Private T. Clough, Army Gymnastic Staff, Central School, Spennymoor,
- Company Sergeant Major W. Coleman, Yorkshire Regiment, 9th Battalion (Eston, Yorkshire),
- Company Sergeant Major A. S. Cook, Army Cyclist Corps, 14th Cyclist Battalion (Kensal Rise)
- Sergeant W. Cooke, Royal Warwickshire Regiment, 2nd Battalion (Rugby)
- Sapper F. J. Coombes, Royal Engineers (Lewisham)
- Private G. H. Cox, Royal Army Service Corps (Bradford)
- Corporal A. C. Craig, Royal Army Service Corps, 23rd Division M.T. Company (Chipping Sodbury)
- Sergeant Drummer F. W. Crisp, Royal Warwickshire Regiment, 2nd Battalion (Walworth, London),
- Company Sergeant Major G. F. Critchley, Machine Gun Corps, 48th Battalion (Gloucester)
- Private W. H. Croasdell, Royal Army Medical Corps, 70th Field Ambulance (Peckham)
- Lance Bombardier A. A. Crouch, Royal Garrison Artillery, 247th Siege Battery (Gravesend)
- Quartermaster Sergeant S. H. Danby, West Yorkshire Regiment, 11th Battalion (Manchester)
- Private S. W. Daniels, Royal Army Veterinary Corps, 35th Mob. Veterinary Sec. (Cheltenham) Regiment,
- Sergeant J. F. Darling, Royal Army Service Corps, J. Corps, MT. Company (Eltham),
- Private J. O. Davies, Royal Army Service Corps, 23rd HQ (Llangollen)
- Private H. C. Dawson, Royal Army Veterinary Corps, Veterinary Hospital (Bromley-by-Bow),
- Private S. Day, Royal Army Service Corps, 39th Company (Reading)
- Quartermaster Sergeant O. R. Delicate, Northumberland Fusiliers, 10th Battalion (E. Newcastle upon Tyne)
- Private G. G. W. Detheridge, Royal Engineers, Signal Company, Headquarters, Heavy Artillery (Hitchin)
- Company Sergeant Major A. H. Dines, Royal Army Service Corps, 1034 Company (Lavender Hill)
- Sergeant W. Donaldson, Royal Engineers, 6th Field Survey Company (Belfast)
- Sergeant P. Douglas, Labour Corps, 210th Divisional Emp. Company (Alloa)
- Corporal H. Doyle, Scots Guards, 2nd Battalion (Chelford)
- Lance Corporal T. W. Driver, Royal Army Ordnance Corps, L. of C. (Leicester),
- Company Quartermaster Sergeant A. H. Dyer, Gloucestershire Regiment, 4th Battalion (Bristol)
- Private J. A. Earley, Royal Berkshire Regiment, 4th Battalion (Reading)
- Staff Sergeant J. A. Edwards, Royal Army Service Corps, 1st Company, 23rd D.T. (Pembroke Dock)
- Sergeant Major W. G. Elcombe, Royal Army Medical Corps, 22nd Field Ambulance (Forest Gate)
- Corporal W. Elsworth, Royal Engineers, 20th Infantry Brigade (Kensal Rise)
- Private G. W. Elwell, Royal Army Medical Corps, 21st Field Ambulance (South Hemsall)
- Staff Sergeant Major A. J. Embleton, Royal Army Service Corps, 2nd Company, 23rd D.T. (Clapham)
- Sergeant T. S. Entwistle, Royal Engineers, Headquarters, 48th Division (E. Lancaster)
- Staff Sergeant F. J. Evans, Royal Army Service Corps, 460th H.T. Company (Harborne)
- Private J. W. Evans, Royal Army Service Corps (Liverpool)
- Company Quartermaster Sergeant H. Fail, Northumberland Fusiliers, 11th Battalion (Wickham)
- Mechanist Staff Sergeant A. F. Flint, Royal Army Service Corps, 48th Division M.T. Company (Chelmsford)
- Company Sergeant Major F. Floyd, Royal Warwickshire Regiment, 5th Battalion (Birmingham)
- Sergeant F. J. Fluck, Machine Gun Corps, 48th Battalion (Cheltenham)
- Sergeant F. Fowler, Royal Warwickshire Regiment, 5th Battalion (Bownville)
- Private G. H. Francis, North Staffordshire Regiment, 1st Battalion (Smethwick)
- Private P. R. Francis, Royal Army Veterinary Corps, 7th Division (South Africa)
- Colour Sergeant R. Franckeiss, Machine Gun Corps, 7th Battalion (Putney)
- Corporal R. Freeman, Royal Army Service Corps, Headquarters, 7th Division (Daventry)
- Staff Sergeant Major F. G. Gent, Northamptonshire Yeomanry (Wellingboro)
- Corporal E. R. Goodchild, Royal Army Service Corps, Headquarters, 69th Infantry Brigade (Bradford)
- Squadron Quartermaster Sergeant A. A. Goodey, Royal Army Service Corps, 32nd L. of C. Sup. Company (Ipswich)
- Corporal W. A. Goodhew, Royal Army Service Corps, 2nd Base Motor Transport Depot (Westcliff)
- Corporal E. J. Goreham, Royal Army Service Corps (Great Yarmouth)
- Sergeant P. Graley, Manchester Regiment, 22nd Battalion (Manchester)
- Battery Sergeant Major R. Grantham, Royal Field Artillery, 31/35th Brigade (Scunthorpe)
- Sergeant T. G. Griffiths, Royal Warwickshire Regiment, 6th Battalion (Birmingham)
- Sergeant J. Grindrod, Manchester Regiment, 22nd Battalion (Manchester)
- Sergeant W. Haggerston, Yorkshire Regiment, 8th Battalion (South Shields)
- Sergeant A. W. Hall, Labour Corps, 263rd Labour Company (London)
- 2nd Corporal W. J. Hall, Royal Engineers, 285th A.T. Company (Walton-at-Stone)
- Corporal J. H. Hallworth, Royal Army Service Corps, 654th Company (Poynson)
- Sergeant G. H. Hardiman, Gloucestershire Regiment, 5th Battalion (Gloucester)
- Staff Sergeant P. Hare, Royal Engineers (Peterborough)
- Company Quartermaster Sergeant H. J. Harmsworth, Oxfordshire & Buckinghamshire Light Infantry, 4th Battalion (Deddington)
- Sergeant H. P. Harrison, Royal Army Medical Corps, 3rd (S Mid) Field Ambulance (Bristol)
- Company Sergeant Major A. L. J. Heal, Devonshire Regiment, 8th Battalion (Fareham)
- Private J. H. Henderson, Coldstream Guards, 3rd Battalion (Berwick-on-Tweed)
- Sergeant S. Hill, Manchester Regiment, 24th Battalion (Oldham)
- Quartermaster Sergeant T. Holliman, Royal West Surrey Regiment, 2nd Battalion (Brentwood)
- Corporal W. G. Hopkins, Machine Gun Corps, 7th Battalion (Newton Longville)
- Sergeant W. Hopper, Yorkshire Light Infantry, 8th Battalion (Arthington)
- Corporal Engineers Clerk W. H. Hopper, Royal Engineers (Saltburn-by-the-Sea)
- Sergeant E. J. Horsley, Royal Warwickshire Regiment, 6th Battalion (Sudbury)
- Sergeant Major G. F. Hurran, Royal Army Medical Corps, 62nd General Hospital (South Woodford),
- Staff Sergeant Major J. Huskisson, Royal Army Service Corps, HQL. of C. (Boughton Heath),
- Private F. Isted, Royal Sussex Regiment, 5th Battalion (Ashburnham)
- Sergeant J. R. Jenkinson, Royal West Surrey Regiment, 2nd Battalion (Finsbury Park)
- Quartermaster Sergeant W. R. G. Johnson, Worcestershire Regiment, 7th Battalion (Kidderminster)
- Corporal A. P. Jones, Royal Army Service Corps, attd. 71st Field Ambulance (Blackpool)
- Driver T. M. Jones, Royal Field Artillery, 48th Divisional Artillery Column (Cwmbach)
- Sergeant T. R. Jones, Worcestershire Regiment, 8th Battalion (Bromyard)
- Staff Sergeant J. H. Joyce, Royal Army Ordnance Corps (Leicester)
- Sergeant W. Kernohan, Royal Engineers, 95th Field Company (Belfast)
- Private A. Kidby, Royal Army Veterinary Corps, attd. Headquarters, 91st Infantry Brigade (Weeley Heath),
- Private G. A. King, Royal Army Service Corps, Headquarters, 48th Division (North Finchley),
- Sergeant A. R. Laing, Royal Engineers, Signal Company (Birmingham)
- Battery Quartermaster Sergeant F. K. Langdon, Royal Field Artillery, 72nd Brigade, A.C. (Baling)
- Company Quartermaster Sergeant O. Lapworth, Royal Warwickshire Regiment, 7th Battalion (Nuneaton)
- Driver A. Lawton, Royal Army Service Corps, 3rd Company, 48th D.T. (Birmingham)
- Sergeant S. H. Leggett, Royal Engineers, 8th (Mon.) A.T. Company (Portsea)
- Sergeant G. R. Leggott, Royal Field Artillery, D/102nd Brigade (Scunthorpe)
- Private L. Leonard, Labour Corps, 196th Labour Company (Musselburgh)
- Private W. H. Lloyd, Oxfordshire & Buckinghamshire Light Infantry, 4th Battalion (Great Bedwyn)
- 2nd Corporal P. F. Lodge, Royal Engineers, 23rd Signal Company (Boscombe)
- Gunner F. Lord, Royal Field Artillery, 35th Brigade (Rusthall)
- Private R. Lucas, Royal Army Service Corps, Headquarters, 48th Division (Handsworth),
- Private D. Maltby, Royal Army Medical Corps, 69th Field Ambulance (Nottingham)
- Private H. J. Manton, Royal Engineers, Signal Company General Headquarters, (Wood Green, London),
- Lance Corporal J. Maples, Corps Of Military Police, Military Foot Police (Sparkhill)
- Mechanist Staff Sergeant S. H. Markham, Royal Army Service Corps, 609th Company (Norwich)
- Corporal W. Mason, Labour Corps, 210th Division Emp. Company (Todmorden)
- Sergeant J. Massey, Labour Corps, 196th Labour Company (Tipton)
- Farrier Quartermaster Sergeant J. May, Northamptonshire Yeomanry (Castlethorpe)
- Sergeant A. McConvill, South Staffordshire Regiment, 1st Battalion (Birmingham)
- Private L. McCoy, Royal Warwickshire Regiment, 6th Battalion (Birmingham)
- Sergeant D. McGrath, Royal Engineers, 285th A.T. Company (Eastwood)
- Sergeant J. Milligan MM Border Regiment, 2nd Battalion (Workington)
- Sergeant S. G. Milton, Devonshire Regiment, 9th Battalion (Exeter)
- Sergeant R. Mol, Gordon Highlanders, 2nd Battalion (Glasgow)
- Sergeant R. Moody, Royal Army Service Corps, 19th Squadron Rmts. (Claverton),
- Private F. A. Moss, Royal Army Service Corps, General Headquarters, (Clapham Common)
- Sergeant J. Murdoch, Royal Field Artillery, 103rd Brigade (Aberdeen)
- Private J. Murphy, Manchester Regiment, 21st Battalion (Manchester)
- Company Sergeant Major J. Murphy, Machine Gun Corps, 23rd Battalion (Cork)
- Staff Sergeant Major W. G. Needham, Royal Army Service Corps, 2nd Auxiliary Pk. T. (Basingstoke),
- Sergeant S. W. Newton, Oxfordshire & Buckinghamshire Light Infantry, 1st Buckinghamshire Battalion (Stone)
- Private F. Nickson, Manchester Regiment, 20th Battalion (Manley)
- Sergeant G. Nightingale, Royal Warwickshire Regiment, 5th Battalion (Birmingham)
- Private H. Nuttall, Manchester Regiment, 24th Battalion (Manchester)
- Battery Sergeant Major F. J. Packer, Royal Garrison Artillery, 176th Siege Battery (Laira)
- Temp Staff Sergeant Major G. Packer, Royal Army Service Corps, 86th Company (Deptford)
- Private R. H. Painter, Manchester Regiment, 21st Battalion (Manchester)
- Corporal F. R. Parker, Worcestershire Regiment, 8th Battalion (Buckingham)
- Sergeant R. J. Parker, Royal Engineers, Signal Company (Finsbury, London),
- Temp Sergeant Major H. S. Parlett, Royal Garrison Artillery, 7th Divisional Artillery (Crouch End)
- Sergeant A. R. Parnell, Royal Warwickshire Regiment, 7th Battalion (Nuneaton)
- Sergeant E. J. Peverett, Royal Engineers, Postal Section (Hendon)
- Mechanist Staff Sergeant A. G. Pillar, Royal Army Service Corps, 654th Company (Cotmd)
- Company Quartermaster Sergeant C. R. Pitman, Royal Berkshire Regiment, 4th Battalion (Reading)
- Company Sergeant Major J. Pollock, Machine Gun Corps, 48th Battalion (Cavan)
- Private E. J. Pratt, Royal Army Medical Corps, attd. D.D.M.S. (Weston-super-Mare)
- Temp Sergeant Major G. W. Pullen, York & Lancaster Regiment, 9th Battalion (Maidstone)
- Sergeant R. Rigby, Border Regiment, 2nd Battalion (Manchester)
- Ft Staff Sergeant W. M. Robb, Royal Garrison Artillery, 317th Siege Battery (Lonmay)
- Sergeant L. Roberts, Royal Field Artillery, 105/22nd Brigade (Mitcham)
- Private A. Robinson, Machine Gun Corps, 23rd Battalion (Birmingham)
- Sergeant T. Rourke, Royal Army Veterinary Corps, 22nd Veterinary Hospital (Goldenhill),
- Sergeant A. G. R. Russell, Oxfordshire & Buckinghamshire Light Infantry, 4th Battalion (Chichester)
- Quartermaster Sergeant G. Rutter, Royal Army Medical Corps, 2nd (S. Mid) Field Ambulance (Walsall)
- Corporal C. Salter, South Staffordshire Regiment, 9th Battalion (Wolverhampton)
- Corporal R. Sansome, Oxfordshire & Buckinghamshire Light Infantry, 4th Battalion (Launton, Bicester)
- Gunner M. Scott, Royal Field Artillery, 7th Divisional Artillery Column (Morpeth)
- Corporal H. Scrouston, Machine Gun Corps, 23rd Battalion (Leven)
- Company Sergeant Major R. Sinclair, Royal Engineers, Signal Company (E. Dublin)
- Sergeant J. Slater, Royal Engineers, 528th Durham Field Company (Whiteinch)
- Quartermaster Sergeant C. G. Sleath, Royal Warwickshire Regiment, 8th Battalion (Wolverhampton)
- Sergeant T. Slim, Machine Gun Corps, 144th Company (Netherton)
- Squadron Quartermaster Sergeant J. T. H. Smith, Royal Army Service Corps, 4th Company, 48th D.T. (Reading)
- Company Quartermaster Sergeant F. A. Snarey, Royal Berkshire Regiment, 4th Battalion (Beading)
- Company Sergeant Major T. Spedding, Durham Light Infantry, 12th Battalion (Pelton Fell)
- Squadron Quartermaster Sergeant J. Spencer, Northamptonshire Yeomanry (Peterborough)
- Corporal J. L. Spokes, Royal Field Artillery, 3rd (South Midland) Brigade (Birmingham)
- Staff Sergeant R. Stacey, Royal Army Service Corps, Headquarters, 7th Division (Goodmayes),
- Private A. Starr, Royal Army Service Corps, Headquarters, 14th Corps (Hollington),
- Quartermaster Sergeant J. Stevens, South Staffordshire Regiment, 9th Battalion (Newtown, N. Wales),
- Sergeant W. G. Stevens, Royal Engineers, 48th D.S. Company (Bristol)
- Sergeant E. G. Stone, Royal Warwickshire Regiment, 8th Battalion (Birmingham)
- Sergeant J. Strachan, Gordon Highlanders, 2nd Battalion (Denny)
- Private L. S. Stratford, Oxfordshire & Buckinghamshire Light Infantry, 4th Battalion (Chipping Norton)
- Bombardier H. R. Taylor, Royal Garrison Artillery, Clks. Sec. (St. Thomas, Exeter)
- Corporal J. T. N. Taylor, Royal Army Service Corps, 654th Company (Manchester)
- Private W. Taylor, Devonshire Regiment, 8th Battalion (Bedminster)
- Corporal W. Telfer, Durham Light Infantry, 12th Battalion (Chester-le-Street)
- Company Sergeant Major J. R. Thome, Royal Engineers, 474th (S. Mid.) Field Company (Bedminster)
- Company Sergeant Major T. Tinlin, Royal Army Service Corps, 7th Division M.T. Company (Heaton)
- Sergeant C. Turner, Royal Field Artillery, 48th Trench Mortar Battery (Arlesey)
- Corporal S. Twine, West Riding Regiment, 10th Battalion (Keighley)
- Private M. R. Vaughan, Lancers, 16th (Lewisham)
- Quartermaster Sergeant H. Waine, Machine Gun Corps, 48th Battalion (Bicester)
- Battery Quartermaster Sergeant G. F. Walker, Royal Field Artillery, 23rd Divisional Artillery Column (Seaford)
- Corporal H. Walker, Royal Welsh Fusiliers, 1st Battalion (Smethwick)
- Private G. Wallington, Royal Army Service Corps (Eckmansworth)
- Corporal M. A. Walsh, Honourable Artillery Company, 2nd Battalion (Tuam)
- Corporal R. Westwood, Northumberland Fusiliers, 11th Battalion (Royston)
- Company Sergeant Major A. H. White, Royal Sussex Regiment, 5th Battalion (Hastings)
- Company Sergeant Major H. J. White, Royal Engineers, 48th Divisional Signals Company (Horfield)
- Company Quartermaster Sergeant F. C. Williams, Gloucestershire Regiment, 6th Battalion (Bristol)
- Sergeant F. M. Williams, Devonshire Regiment, 8th Battalion (Penzance)
- Sergeant J. G. Wilson, Royal West Surrey Regiment, 2nd Battalion (Harrow)
- Sergeant J. L. Wilson, Royal Army Service Corps, 14th Corps Troops Company (Paisley)
- Driver J. H. Winter, Royal Field Artillery, 2nd South Midland Brigade (Kidderminster)
- Sergeant R. Witcombe, Gloucestershire Regiment, 6th Battalion (Bristol)
- Sergeant G. A. Woodland, Coldstream Guards, 3rd Battalion (Bath)
- Private H. L. Wright, Royal Welsh Fusiliers, 1st Battalion (Openshaw)
- Corporal R. Yapp, Worcestershire Regiment, 7th Battalion (Tenbury)
- Sergeant G. D. Adam, 4th Battalion, attd. 2nd Battalion, Argyll and Sutherland Highlanders (Glasgow)
- Corporal C. Adams, 230th Siege Battery, Royal Garrison Artillery (Crimpleston, Norfolk)
- Company Sergeant Major R. Adams, 9th Battalion, Royal Inniskilling Fusiliers (Barnscourt, County Tyrone)
- Fitter W. K. Aldborough, 121st Heavy Battery, Royal Garrison Artillery (Norwich)
- Private B. Aldridge, 2nd Battalion, York & Lancaster Regiment (Sheffield)
- Sergeant G. Alexander, 41st Battery, Royal Field Artillery (Abertillery)
- Company Sergeant Major C. E. Allen, 10th Battalion, East Yorkshire Regiment (Bridlington)
- Corporal H. J. Allen, 5th Battalion, Northumberland Fusiliers (Fletcham, King's Lynn)
- Corporal W. L. Anderson, 37th Divisional Signals Company, Royal Engineers (Gateshead)
- Lance Corporal A. Andrews, 12th Battalion, Norfolk Regiment, T.F (Norwich)
- Sergeant F. Archer MM 1st Battalion, Duke of Cornwall's Light Infantry (Ponders End)
- Sergeant L. W. Ardley, No. 1 Spec. Company, Royal Engineers (Barking)
- Company Sergeant Major G. E. Argyle, 155th Field Company, Royal Engineers (Pembroke Dock)
- Sergeant S. Armstrong, 1/7th Battalion, Cheshire Regiment (Macclesfield)
- Sapper T. Arthur, 151st Field Company, Royal Engineers (Tyslorstown, Glamorgan)
- Sergeant C. T. Atkinson, 116th Battery, 26th Army Brigade, Royal Field Artillery (London)
- Sergeant H. Atkinson, VII. Corps Cyclist Battalion, Army Cyclist Corps (Lancaster)
- Sapper J. Atkinson, 2nd Field Sur. Battalion, Royal Engineers (Gillingham, Kent)
- Sergeant J. Atterbury, 1/6th Battalion, Nottinghamshire and Derbyshire Regiment (Ashbourne)
- Company Quartermaster Sergeant W. Austin, 1st Battalion, Bedfordshire Regiment (Redbourne)
- Corporal S. P. Baggott, 280th Siege Battery, 16th Brigade, Royal Garrison Artillery (Pleck, Walsall)
- Sergeant J. W. Bailey, attd. T. A.A. Battery, Royal Garrison Artillery (Stoke-on-Trent)
- Corporal T. L. Bailey, B/177th Brigade, Royal Field Artillery (Burslem)
- Company Sergeant Major H. Baker, 25th Battalion, Royal Welsh Fusiliers (Rhondda Valley)
- 2nd Corporal M. Baker, 152nd Field Company, Royal Engineers (Manchester)
- Sergeant L. J. Baldwin, D/330th (East Lancaster) Brigade, Royal Field Artillery (Rowhedge)
- Lance Corporal H. J. Bamford, 6th Battalion, Somerset Light Infantry (Bristol)
- Sergeant F. Bareham, 113th Siege Battery, Royal Garrison Artillery (E. Clacton, Essex)
- Company Sergeant Major R. Barker, 2/6th Battalion, Liverpool Regiment (Wakefield)
- Colour Sergeant A. Barr, 9th Battalion, Scottish Rifles (Creetown)
- Sergeant M. Barr MM C/106th Brigade, Royal Field Artillery (Balloch)
- Signaller (Bombardier) H. C. Barrett, attd. 95th Brigade, Royal Field Artillery (Tooting)
- Pioneer J. Barren, 35th Divisional Signals Company, Royal Engineers (Kinnillar, Aderdeen)
- Private E. Barsdell, 8th Battalion (now Depot), East Surrey Regiment (Bayswater)
- Corporal T. E. G. Bashford, Royal Army Service Corps, attd. 65th Siege Battery, Ammunition Column, Royal Garrison Artillery (Boro Green, Kent)
- Sergeant H. Bastow MM Signal Sub-Sect, Royal Engineers, attd. 81st Brigade, Royal Garrison Artillery (Bradford)
- Battery Sergeant Major E. Bathe, 28th Siege Battery, Royal Garrison Artillery (nr. Petworth, Sussex)
- Sergeant W. Bayfield, 11th Battalion, Durham Light Infantry (South Shields)
- Sergeant H. C. Beale, 18th Battalion, Middlesex Regiment, attd. 36th Trench Mortar Battery (Wood Green, London)
- Corporal E. A. Beales, Royal Garrison Artillery, attd. C. A.A. Battery. (Button)
- Sergeant J. H. Beard, 7th Battalion, Leicestershire Regiment (Coulville)
- Sergeant J. Beattie, 20th Siege Battery, Royal Garrison Artillery (Hartlepool)
- Lance Corporal J. C. Beauchamp, 341st Road Con. Company, Royal Engineers (Birmingham)
- Sergeant F. Beaver, 16th Battalion, Royal Warwickshire Regiment (Birmingham)
- Sergeant W. H. Beavington, 2/2nd Battalion London Regiment (Kingsway, London)
- Sergeant F. Beck MM 9th Battalion, Norfolk Regiment (Walsingham)
- Private J. F. Beck, 17th Battalion, Royal Welsh Fusiliers (Cockermouth)
- Sergeant A. Beddows, B/285th (West Lancaster) Brigade, Royal Field Artillery (Tettenhall Wood)
- Sergeant Drummer W. Bell, 3rd Battalion, London Regiment (Oicklewood)
- Sergeant T. Belliss MM 520th (London) Field Company, Royal Engineers (Fulham, London)
- Lance Sergeant G. Bellyou, 15th Battalion, Cheshire Regiment (Bethnal Green, London)
- Bombardier S. Bent, 331st Siege Battery, Royal Garrison Artillery (Nottingham)
- Sergeant H. Bentley MM 210th (East Lancaster) Brigade, Royal Field Artillery (Accrington)
- Sergeant L. Beverley, 140th Siege Battery, Royal Garrison Artillery (Worthing)
- Sergeant C. Billson, 7th Battalion, Leicestershire Regiment (Leicester)
- Corporal W. Blackhurst, Royal Field Artillery, attd. X/24th Trench Mortar Battery (Hayes, Staffs.)
- Lance Corporal E. Blacktin, Labour Corps (Sparkbrook)
- Sergeant S. Blake, Royal Artillery A. Battery, Royal Garrison Artillery (Branksome, Dorset)
- Temp Staff Sergeant Major G. J. Bleach, 4th Cavalry Division Auxiliary M.T. Company, Royal Army Service Corps (Blackland, Kent)
- Corporal J. F. Bliss, 9th Battalion, North Staffordshire Regiment (Edgbaston)
- Sapper W. H. Bloxham, 35th Divisional Signals Company, Royal Engineers (Maidstone)
- Company Sergeant Major F. Blunt, 61st Battalion, Machine Gun Corps (Bradford)
- Acting Company Sergeant Major G. E. Blunt, 1st Battalion, Border Regiment (London)
- Pioneer J. Blyth, 196th L.D. Company, Royal Engineers (Alford, Lincolnshire)
- Lance Corporal W. J. Boal, 9th Battalion, Royal Inniskilling Fusiliers (Belfast)
- Battery Quartermaster Sergeant J. W. Boddie, 1st Battalion, Dorsetshire Regiment (Southsea)
- Bombardier A. Bode, 49th Battery, Royal Field Artillery (Liverpool)
- Sergeant W. S. Bodimead, C/230th (North Midland) Brigade, Royal Field Artillery (East Finchley)
- Private H. Bodsworth, 2nd Battalion, Lincolnshire Regiment (Sheffield)
- Sergeant W. C. Bolter, 4th Battalion, Royal Fusiliers (Custom House, London)
- Battery Sergeant Major A. W. Bond, 232nd Siege Battery, Royal Garrison Artillery (Melton Constable)
- Temp Regimental Sergeant Major E. E. Bond, 1st King Edward's Horse (Liverpool)
- Battery Quartermaster Sergeant J. Bond, 2nd Battalion, Leinster Regiment (Clonmellon)
- Sergeant J. Booth, 175th Tunnelling Company, Royal Engineers (Milton)
- Company Sergeant Major J. S. Boothroyd, 29th Battalion, Durham Light Infantry (Lockwood)
- Company Sergeant Major G. W. Boreham, 1st Battalion, Grenadier Guards (Shotley, Ipswich)
- Sergeant W. H. Bossom, L. Spec. Company, Royal Engineers (Cannock)
- Sergeant F. Bound, 276th Siege Battery, Royal Garrison Artillery (Wooleton)
- Company Quartermaster Sergeant P. G. Bowden, 2nd Battalion, Machine Gun Corps (Bristol)
- Company Sergeant Major W. J. Bowen, 1/2nd Battalion, Monmouthshire Regiment (Abercarn) J91790
- Lance Bombardier H. Box, L. A.A. Battery, Royal Garrison Artillery (Bristol)
- Acting Company Sergeant Major R. Boyd, 1/4th Battalion, Royal Scots Fusiliers (Stevenson)
- Gunner R. Bradley, 50th Battery, 34 Army Brigade, Royal Field Artillery (Blackburn)
- Sergeant C. E. Braithwaite, 49th Siege Battery, Royal Garrison Artillery (Glamorgan)
- Company Sergeant Major E. Branch, 25th Battalion, Royal Welsh Fusiliers (Taffe Well)
- Battery Sergeant Major R. Branch, 18th Army Brigade Ammunition Column, Royal Field Artillery (Woodham Ferris)
- Company Sergeant Major J. C. Brash, 412th Field Company, Royal Engineers (Glenboig)
- Sergeant L. Brazier, 2/4th Battalion, Royal West Surrey Regiment (Lindfield, Sussex)
- Sergeant H. Breckenridge, 1/5th Battalion, Argyll and Sutherland Highlanders (Greenock)
- Sergeant W. Brewis MM 1/1st Northumberland Hussars (Birkley)
- Sergeant J. Bridger, Railway Operating Division, Royal Engineers (Dulwich)
- Private H. Bridgman, 1st (North Midland) Field Ambulance, Royal Army Medical Corps (Derby)
- Battery Sergeant Major H. A. Bridle, 291st Siege Battery, Royal Garrison Artillery (Coventry)
- Temp Regimental Sergeant Major J. E. Bright, 1/4th Battalion, Cheshire Regiment (Hapton, near Burnley)
- Sergeant R. Brine, let Battalion, Hampshire Regiment (Acton Vale, London)
- Sergeant E. L. Briesenden, 179th (now 289th) Siege Battery, Royal Garrison Artillery (Ashford)
- 2nd Corporal E. Broadhead, 37th Divisional Signals Company, Royal Engineers (Manchester)
- Staff Sergeant W. Brookes MM 63rd (West Lancaster) Field Ambulance, Royal Army Medical Corps (Liverpool)
- Sergeant W. C. Brookland, 1/20th Battalion, London Regiment (Eltham)
- Company Sergeant Major J. Brooks, 11th Battalion, Rifle Brigade (Brightlingsea)
- Lance Corporal T. Browning, 124th Field Company, Royal Engineers (Beeston)
- Sapper G. Buckeridge, 37th Divisional Signals Company, Royal Engineers (Nunhead, London)
- Company Quartermaster Sergeant W. H. Budgen, 7th Battalion, Royal Sussex Regiment (East Grinstead)
- Acting Corporal G. Bullimore, 8th Battalion, Seaforth Highlanders, attd. 44th Trench Mortar Battery (North Waisham)
- Private F. Bunce, Royal Army Service Corps, attd. O.A.A. Battery, Royal Garrison Artillery (Fordingbridge)
- Sergeant J. H. J. Burgess, 9th Battalion, Nottinghamshire and Derbyshire Regiment (Newark)
- Staff Sergeant F. G. Burling, 2/1st (South Midland) Field Ambulance, Royal Army Medical Corps (Birmingham)
- Gunner J. Burns, 256th (Highland) Brigade, Royal Field Artillery (Methil, Fife)
- Sergeant R. W. M. Burns, 2/5th Battalion, Royal Lancaster Regiment (Lancaster)
- Corporal A. E. Burr, 103rd Field Company, Royal Engineers (Camberwell, London)
- Sergeant H. J. Burr, D/52nd Army Brigade, Royal Field Artillery (Fleet, Hampshire.)
- Sergeant F. L. Butler, N/5th Army Brigade, Royal Horse Artillery (Bermondsey)
- Private H. Butler, 2/4th Battalion, Royal Berkshire Regiment (Maidenhead)
- Sergeant M. A. Butler MM 1st Field Ambulance, Royal Army Medical Corps (Reading)
- Private J. A. Byrne, 14th Battalion, Royal Welsh Fusiliers (Clacton-on-Sea)
- Farrier Staff Sergeant J. Cahill, 11th Hussars (Kilcullen)
- Regimental Sergeant Major T. Cahill, 1st Battalion, Irish Guards (Bandon, County Cork)
- Private W. G. Calder, 1/14th Battalion, London Regiment, attd. 168th Trench Mortar Battery (Shawlands)
- Company Sergeant Major A. Caldwell, 16th Battalion, Highland Light Infantry (Glasgow)
- Staff Sergeant Major A. Callaghan, 8th Squadron, Cavalry Machine Gun Corps (Baling)
- Sergeant J. B. Callaghan, 8th Battalion, Tank Corps (Glossop)
- Sergeant N. Cameron, 9th Battalion, Gordon Highlanders (Perth)
- Sapper A. Campbell, 52nd (Lowland) Divisional Signals Company, Royal Engineers (Glasgow)
- Fitter Staff Sergeant J. Capey, 139th Heavy Battery, Royal Garrison Artillery (Hanley)
- Company Quartermaster Sergeant T. Carr, 8th Battalion, Liverpool Regiment (Liverpool)
- Corporal G. H. Carter, Royal Engineers, attd. 113th Army Brigade, Royal Field Artillery (Charles Hill, London)
- Sergeant E. J. Case, 1/17th Battalion, London Regiment (Limehouse)
- Sergeant D. Cattanach, 425th Battery, 44th Brigade, Royal Field Artillery (Friockheim)
- Private C. P. Cavanagh, 10th Hussars (Manchester)
- Corporal J. W. Chadwick, V/1 H Trench Mortar Battery, Royal Garrison Artillery (Shaw, near Oldham)
- Battery Quartermaster Sergeant R. P. Chapman, 6th Dragoons (Wakefield)
- Private P. D. Charles, 1/5th Battalion, London Regiment (Newport, Mon.)
- Temp Regimental Sergeant Major H. Chesney, 1/20th Battalion, London Regiment (Charlton)
- Battery Sergeant Major E. B. Child, attd. 16th Army Brigade, Royal Horse Artillery (Great Yarmouth)
- Private H. S. Child, 15/17th Battalion, West Yorkshire Regiment (York)
- Sapper H. M. Christopher, 38th Divisional Signals Company, Royal Engineers (Liverpool)
- Staff Sergeant Major E. J. Churchill, 20th Hussars (Norwich)
- Sergeant R. C. Clammer, 1/4th Battalion, London Regiment (Pitfield Street, London)
- Acting Sergeant C. Clarke, Border Regiment, attd. 1st Battalion, Wiltshire Regiment (Carlisle)
- Sergeant A. E. Clements, 5th Battalion, Tank Corps (Walworth, London)
- Private F. H. G. Clements, 1st Battalion, Tank Corps (Paignton)
- Private O. Cliff, 2nd Battalion, Yorkshire Light Infantry (Sheffield)
- Sergeant F. T. Clifford, 94th Field Company, Royal Engineers (Stow-on-the-Wold)
- Sergeant P. Cobley, 1st Battalion, Wiltshire Regiment (Wimbledon)
- Private W. R. Colclough, 4th Battalion, Yorkshire Regiment, attd. 150th Trench Mortar Battery (Thornaby)
- Sergeant W. J. P. Cole, Royal Army Service Corps, attd. 260th Siege Battery, Ammunition Column, Royal Garrison Artillery (Southampton)
- Sergeant G. R. Ceilings, 24th Divisional Signals Company, Royal Engineers (Swindon)
- Sergeant J. Colman MM 55th Battalion, Machine Gun Corps (Wroxham)
- Company Sergeant Major J. Conn, 9th Battalion, Royal Inniskilling Fusiliers (Caledon, County Tyrone)
- 2nd Corporal J. Connor, 55th (West Lancaster) Divisional Signals Company, Royal Engineers (St. Helens)
- Private E. Conroy, 1/5th Battalion, Lincolnshire Regiment (Cleethorpea)
- Sergeant H. C. Cook, attd. 173rd Brigade, Royal Field Artillery (Tring)
- Smith/Quartermaster Sergeant J. Cook, 87th Siege Battery, Royal Garrison Artillery (Portsmouth)
- Lance Corporal J. Cooper, 1/5th Battalion, Nottinghamshire and Derbyshire Regiment (New Mills, Derby)
- Acting Sergeant A. V. Coppard, 2nd Battalion, Royal Sussex Regiment (Hurst Green, Sussex)
- Sergeant P. G. Cork, attd. 74th Brigade, Royal Field Artillery (Dover)
- Sergeant H. Comes, 1st Battalion, Shropshire Light Infantry, attd. 16th Trench Mortar Battery (Stoke-on-Trent)
- Petty Officer T. Cotcher, Drake Battalion, Royal Naval Volunteer Reserve (Wallsend-on-Tyne)
- Sergeant E. Cottam, 351st Siege Battery, Royal Garrison Artillery (Plymouth)
- Sergeant L. Couch, 21st Heavy Battery, Royal Garrison Artillery (Ilfracombe)
- Corporal A. Coviello, 28th Battalion, posted 16th Battalion, London Regiment (Brondesbury)
- Private T. Cowan, 14th Battalion, Highland Light Infantry (Glasgow)
- Sergeant G. Craddock, B/47th Brigade, Royal Field Artillery (Ely.)
- Sergeant J. Crankshaw, 114th A.A. Section, Royal Garrison Artillery (Morton)
- Regimental Sergeant Major J. Cresswell, 2nd Battalion, Durham Light Infantry (Bishop Auckland)
- Private W. C. Crosby, 37th Division Supp. Column Royal Army Service Corps (Chelsea)
- Gunner G. Crossland, D/83rd Brigade, Royal Field Artillery (Crofton)
- Sergeant E. Crowston MM 108th Siege Battery, Royal Garrison Artillery (Radford)
- Private H. Croxall, 8th Battalion, Machine Gun Corps (Annesley)
- Sergeant R. J. Cullen, B/152nd Brigade, Royal Field Artillery (Margate)
- Sergeant T. Cullen, 1st Battalion, Royal Dublin Fusiliers (Dublin)
- Sergeant A. R. Cunningham, Y Battery, 7th Brigade, Royal Horse Artillery (Pres-de-Samer, France)
- Lance Corporal A. J. Curd, 13th Battalion, Royal Sussex Regiment (Lancing, Sussex)
- Company Sergeant Major J. Cussens, Royal Inniskilling Fusiliers (Farnborough, Hampshire)
- Mtr.Cyclist Sergeant H. A. Cutler, 1st Divisional Signals Company, Royal Engineers (King's Norton)
- Sergeant A. Cutting, D/88th Brigade, Royal Field Artillery (Bath)
- Colour Sergeant C. Dadd, 12th How. Battery, R. Mar. Artillery (Bexley Heath)
- Corporal A. Davies, 6th Battalion, Shropshire Light Infantry (Ross)
- Sergeant E. P. Davies, 25th Battalion, Royal Welsh Fusiliers (Newcastle Emlyn)
- Staff Sergeant G. T. Davies, 130th Field Ambulance, Royal Army Medical Corps (Pontardawe)
- Sergeant G. T. Davies, 1/5th Battalion, South Staffordshire Regiment (Hockley)
- Fitter J. H. Davis, 5th Battery, 45th Brigade, Royal Field Artillery (Bristol)
- Sergeant F. Davison, 1st Battalion, Northamptonshire Regiment (Kettering)
- Sergeant B. E. Davy, 479th (South Midland) Field Company, Royal Engineers (Cheltenham)
- Sergeant H. Dawson, 62nd (West Riding) Divisional Signals Company, Royal Engineers (Sheffield)
- Sergeant F. W. Day, 2nd Battalion, Worcestershire Regiment (Forest Hill, London)
- Sergeant H. Dean, 174th Tunnelling Company, Royal Engineers (Oxford)
- Sergeant P. Dearden, attd. 181st Brigade, Royal Field Artillery (Ashton-under-Lyne)
- Sergeant A. Dearnley, 122nd Siege Battery, Royal Garrison Artillery (Huddersfield)
- Sergeant H. Denson, Royal Army Service Corps, attd. 59th Siege Battery, Royal Garrison Artillery (Liverpool)
- Gunner P. Denton, Royal Field Artillery, attd. Headquarters, 34th Army Brigade (E. Cowes)
- Company Sergeant Major T. Derose, 36th Battalion, Machine Gun Corps (Devonport)
- Corporal E. Dewar, 235th Siege Battery, Royal Garrison Artillery (Bootle)
- Squadron Quartermaster Sergeant J. E. Dickinson, 1/1st (Northumberland) Hrs. (Ashington)
- Sergeant P. Dight MM 130th Battery, Royal Field Artillery (Stellington)
- Sergeant J. Dillon, 24th Battalion, Machine Gun Corps (Glasgow)
- Private H. Dixon, 4th Battalion, Lincolnshire Regiment (Grimsby)
- Sergeant A. E. Dodd, 226th Field Company, Royal Engineers (Shoreditch)
- Battery Quartermaster Sergeant T. Donovan, 1st Battalion, Royal Munster Fusiliers (Cork)
- Corporal W. S. Double, Royal Engineers, attd. Headquarters, 47th Brigade, Royal Garrison Artillery (Bow, London)
- Company Sergeant Major G. T. Downes, 10th Battalion, Duke of Cornwall's Light Infantry (Putney, London)
- Sergeant N. Downes, 1/4th Battalion, West Riding Regiment (Cleckheaton)
- Sergeant D. Downie, 29th Battalion, Machine Gun Corps (Dunoon)
- Sergeant J. Drake, 223rd Field Companyr Royal Engineers (Great Milton, near Wallingford)
- Sergeant W. Drake, 150th Siege Battery, Royal Garrison Artillery (Readingley)
- Sergeant E. Drew (Northumberland) Brigade, Royal Field Artillery, attd. 63rd Divisional Ammunition Column (Walkington, Yorkshire)
- Sergeant D. Drylie, 1st Battalion, Scots Guards, attd. Guards Brigade Trench Mortar Battery Dunfermline
- Corporal H. Duckham (South Midland) Brigade, Royal Field Artillery, attd. X/61st Trench Mortar Battery (Bristol)
- Sergeant E. W. Dudley, 175th Company, Labour Corps (Kidderminster)
- Sergeant J. A. Duncan, XVII Corps Cyclist Battalion, Army Cyclist Corps (Wick)
- Battery Quartermaster Sergeant J. Dunn, D/250th (Northumberland) Brigade, Royal Field Artillery (Newcastle upon Tyne)
- Sergeant S. C. Dunnachie, D/290th (London) Brigade, Royal Field Artillery (Oswaldtwistle)
- Shoe/Smith/Corporal G. E. Dumville, B/251st (Northumberland) Brigade, Royal Field Artillery (Pocklington, Yorkshire)
- Battery Sergeant Major O. W. Button, B/180th Brigade, Royal Field Artillery (Didsbury)
- Sergeant S. H. Eades, 2/4th Battalion, Royal West Surrey Regiment T.F. (Croydon)
- Battery Sergeant Major S. Eardley, 1/1st (North Midland) Heavy Battery, Royal Garrison Artillery (Newcastle)
- Regimental Sergeant Major C. H. Edisbury, 15th Battalion, North Lancashire Regiment (Liverpool)
- Battery Sergeant Major C. W. Edmonds, Royal Horse Artillery, attd. 242nd (South Midland) Army Brigade, Royal Field Artillery (London)
- Sergeant A. G. Edwards, Wireless Sec|F. Corps, Signal Company, Royal Engineers (Exeter)
- Sergeant B. C. L. Edwards, 2/15th Battalion, London Regiment (Balham)
- Company Sergeant Major J. P. Edwards, 56th Company, Labour Corps (Rhyl)
- Sergeant W. J. Edwards, 9th Battalion, Royal Welsh Fusiliers (Loughor)
- Battery Sergeant Major F. T. Elbourn, 9th Siege Battery, Royal Garrison Artillery (E. Cambridge)
- Sergeant G. Elliott, 12th Battalion, Nottinghamshire and Derbyshire Regiment (Chesterfield)
- Sergeant H. Ellis, D/110th Brigade, Royal Field Artillery (Hammersmith)
- Smith Sergeant H. J. Eknes, 21st Siege Battery, Royal Garrison Artillery (Swindon)
- Sergeant P. J. Emberson, 9th Battalion, Norfolk Regiment (Brentwood)
- Sergeant A. Emslie, 4d4th (Highland) Field Company, Royal Engineers (Aberdeen)
- Sergeant A. Eustace, 16th Battery, 41st Brigade, Royal Field Artillery (Romiley)
- Sergeant G. Evans MM B/148th Brigade, Royal Field Artillery (Liverpool)
- Private H. J. Evans, 11th Battalion, Somerset Light Infantry (Swindon)
- Company Sergeant Major S. Evans, 1st Battalion, Shropshire Light Infantry (Wellington, Salop)
- Battery Sergeant Major A. C. Eves, 1/1st Kent Heavy Battery, Royal Garrison Artillery (E. Bexley Heath)
- Driver W. Fairbairn, attd. 50th Brigade, Royal Field Artillery (Cramlington)
- Company Sergeant Major W. Fairhurst, 422nd (West Lancaster) Field Company, Royal Engineers (Hadlow, Kent)
- Company Sergeant Major T. Farey, 11th Battalion, East Yorkshire Regiment (Hull)
- Staff Sergeant Major R. Farrant, 7th Dragoon Guards (Folkestone)
- Sergeant B. Farrow, 1st Battalion, Hertfordshire Regiment (Luton)
- Sergeant G. N. Fennell, 9th Battalion, Machine Gun Corps (Ramsgate)
- Company Sergeant Major A. Fiddaman, 39th Battalion, Machine Gun Corps (Ashington)
- Sergeant H. Fielding, 7th Battalion, Leicestershire Regiment (Rotherham)
- Corporal W. Fisher, 2nd Field Sur. Battalion, Royal Engineers (Old Trafford)
- Bombardier W. Fisher, 265th Siege Battery, Royal Garrison Artillery (Claverham, near Bristol)
- Battery Sergeant Major W. M. Flaherty, 287th Siege Battery, Royal Garrison Artillery (Guernsey)
- Corporal C. G. Flockhart, 10th Battalion, Argyll and Sutherland Highlanders (Kelty, Fife)
- Company Sergeant Major J. Ford, 1st Battalion, Cameron Highlanders (Carnoustie)
- Company Sergeant Major W. Forkin, 2/5th Battalion, North Lancashire Regiment T.F. (Bolton)
- Sapper F. Forrest, 5th Field Sur. Battalion, Royal Engineers (Aberdeen)
- Lance Corporal E. Fosten, 18th Hussars (Hull)
- Sergeant W. E. Fountain, 1st Battalion, Machine Gun Corps (Kensington)
- Private W. Fowler, 16th Battalion, Lancashire Fusiliers (Salford)
- Private W. Fowler, 6th (London) Field Ambulance, Royal Army Medical Corps, attd. 1/21st Field Ambulance (Hanwell)
- Company Sergeant Major J. H. S. Francis, 2nd Battalion, Kings Royal Rifle Corps (Wivenhoe)
- Rifleman W. H. Francis, 1/17th Battalion, London Regiment (Euston Square)
- Temp Regimental Sergeant Major S. H. Franey, 23rd Battalion, Royal Fusiliers (Burton-on-Trent)
- Sergeant J. McN. Fraser, 51st Battalion, Machine Gun Corps (Lochane)
- Sergeant W. Fraser, 18th Battalion, Machine Gun Corps (Greenock)
- Sergeant A. E. V. Free, 17th Battalion, Machine Gun Corps (Chelmsford)
- Sergeant A. French, 1/4th Battalion, Leicestershire Regiment (Leicester)
- Corporal J. Frost, 10th Battalion, Liverpool Regiment (Liverpool)
- Company Sergeant Major J. Froud, 2nd Battalion, Royal Scots Fusiliers (Vauxhall, London)
- Sergeant W. C. Fruen, 55th Battalion, Machine Gun Corps (E. Mill Hill)
- Battery Sergeant Major F. J. Fursdon MM 274th Siege Battery, Royal Garrison Artillery (Bishops Fawton, Barnstaple)
- Sapper W. H. Gaffney, 30th Divisional Signals Company, Royal Engineers (E. Chatham)
- Lance Corporal J. Gallimore, 1st Battalion, North Staffordshire Regiment, attd. 72nd Light Trench Mortar Battery (Stoke-on-Trent)
- Smith Gunner A. Galloway, 69th Siege Battery, Royal Garrison Artillery (South Shields)
- Sergeant W. D. Gamble MM 19th Divisional Signals Company, Royal Engineers (Salisbury)
- Sergeant J. B. Gardiner MM 503rd (Wessex) Field Company, Royal Engineers (Bath)
- Gunner F. Gardner, 299th Siege Battery, Royal Garrison Artillery, attd. 16th Ordnance Mob. Workshop (Horsham)
- Sergeant S. Garnett, 15th Battalion, Durham Light Infantry (Daresbury, Cheshire)
- Sergeant A. J. Garrett, 219th Siege Battery, Royal Garrison Artillery (Hull)
- Corporal F. W. Garrod, 1st Battalion, Royal West Kent Regiment (Streatham, London)
- Sergeant J. Gebbie, 249th Siege Battery, Royal Garrison Artillery (Edinburgh)
- Lance Sergeant J. T. Gibbons, 7th Battalion, East Yorkshire Regiment, attd. 50th Infantry Brigade (Glasgow)
- Corporal J. Gibson, Royal Army Service Corps, attd. 329th Siege Battery, Royal Garrison Artillery (Tayport)
- Battery Sergeant Major F. Gilbert, C/331st (East Lancaster) Brigade, Royal Field Artillery (Trudhoe)
- Rifleman W. C. Gillman MM 2nd Battalion, Royal Irish Rifles (Fulham)
- Sergeant F. Gillson, 2nd Battalion, Suffolk Regiment (Rye, Northants)
- Sergeant D. Glendinning, 15th Battalion, H.L.T. (Glasgow)
- Battery Quartermaster Sergeant T. Glenn, 31st Heavy Battery, Royal Garrison Artillery (Colchester)
- Sapper A. Godwin, 17th Divisional Signals Company, Royal Engineers (Regents Park, London)
- Company Sergeant Major W. Godwin MM 57th Battalion, Machine Gun Corps (Swindon)
- Lance Corporal W. T. Goldsworthy, 22nd Company, Labour Corps (Wingate)
- Sergeant W. Goodchild, 1st Battalion, Rifle Brigade (Winchester)
- Sergeant A. Goodey, 2/23rd Battalion, London Regiment (Battersea)
- Battery Sergeant Major H. H. W. Goodings, B/79th Brigade, Royal Field Artillery (Leytonstone)
- Lance Corporal A. E. Gordon, 15th Battalion, Royal Warwickshire Regiment (Birmingham)
- Corporal A. Gough, 175th Company, Labour Corps (Nottingham)
- Sergeant A. F. Gough, 2nd Battalion, Coldstream Guards (Exeter)
- Sergeant F. Gould, 11th Battalion, Tank Corps (Sheffield)
- Corporal J. B. Gourlay, 298th (North Midland) Army Brigade, Royal Field Artillery (St. Andrews, Scotland)
- Company Sergeant Major T. C. Graham, 1/5th Battalion, King's Own Scottish Borderers (Maxwelltown)
- Sergeant W. G. Grand, 1st Battalion Northamptonshire Regiment, attd. 2nd Trench Mortar Battery (Hanwell)
- Gunner J. Green, K Battery, 7th Brigade, Royal Horse Artillery (Ipswich)
- Sapper R. W. Green, 2nd Divisional Signals Company, Royal Engineers (Birmingham)
- Sergeant W. Green, 1st Battalion, Middlesex Regiment (Smithfield)
- Private L. Greenfield, 35th Battalion, Machine Gun Corps (E Leigh, Lancaster)
- Sergeant T. F. Greenfield, 1st Battalion, Royal Warwickshire Regiment (Bow)
- Sergeant S. J. Greening, 11th Battalion, Royal Fusiliers (Fulham)
- Sergeant J. R. Griffin, 2/6th Battalion, Durham Light Infantry (Hull)
- Sergeant G. L. Griffiths MM 42nd Battalion, Machine Gun Corps (Walsall)
- Company Sergeant Major A. E. Groves, 4th Battalion, Yorkshire Regiment (Scarborough)
- Company Sergeant Major T. J. Gudge, 9th Battalion, Machine Gun Corps (Tottenham)
- Corporal F. E. Gurney, 4th Battalion, Machine Gun Corps (Margate)
- Sergeant W. Guy, 5th Battalion, Yorkshire Light Infantry (Pontefract)
- Private A. Haig, 1/9th Battalion, Royal Scots (Currie, Midlothian)
- Driver A. B. Haines, attd. 56th Brigade, Royal Field Artillery (Lower Edmonton)
- Corporal E. Haley, 203rd Field Company, Royal Engineers (Witney, Oxon.)
- Sergeant E. Hall, 258th Tunnelling Company, Royal Engineers (Fulham, London)
- Lance Corporal F. Hall, 1st Btn Welsh Guards (Weybridge)
- Sergeant G. W. Hall, Machine Gun Corps, Machine Gun School (Forest Gate)
- Sergeant J. R. Halligan, 29th Company, Labour Corps (Louth, Lincolnshire)
- Sergeant S. C. Hamley, Royal Army Ordnance Corps (Luton)
- Private J. E. Hammond, 3rd Squadron, Cavalry Machine Gun Corps (Northampton)
- Sergeant J. H. Hammond MM 74th Field Company, Royal Engineers (Donegal)
- Private E. Handyside, 1/7th Battalion, Durham Light Infantry (Beburn Colliery)
- Corporal C. C. Hanks, 122nd Battery, 52nd Army Brigade, Royal Field Artillery (North Walsham)
- Lance Sergeant W. H. Hannaford, 19th Battalion, Middlesex Regiment (Elstree)
- Company Quartermaster Sergeant J. F. Harper, 9th Battalion, Highland Light Infantry (Glasgow)
- Sergeant C. Harris, 216th A.T. Company, Royal Engineers (Nuneaton)
- Staff Sergeant S. Harris, Royal Army Ordnance Corps, attd. 136th Siege Battery, Royal Garrison Artillery (Southampton)
- Corporal B. Harrison, 11th Battalion, Durham Light Infantry (Worksop)
- Sergeant T. Harrison, 2nd Battalion, Yorkshire Regiment (Rotherham)
- Sapper E. W. Hart, Camn. Park Royal Engineers (Portsmouth)
- Sergeant J. H. Hartshorn, 18th Battalion, Welsh Regiment (Bridgend)
- Sergeant R. W. Harvey, 113th Heavy Battery, Royal Garrison Artillery (Dorchester, Wallingf ord)
- Private W. Harvey, 1st Battalion, Royal Warwickshire Regiment (Coventry)
- Company Sergeant Major J. Haslam, 1/5th Battalion, East Lancashire Regiment (Blackburn)
- Sergeant W. Havard, D/170th Brigade, Royal Field Artillery (Wigan)
- Battery Sergeant Major A. J. Hawes, 203rd Siege Battery, Royal Garrison Artillery (Stonebridge Park)
- Lance Bombardier R. H. Hayes, 146th Siege Battery, Royal Garrison Artillery (South Shields)
- Sergeant T. Haynes, 5th Divisional Ammunition Column, Royal Field Artillery (Athlone)
- Company Sergeant Major T. H. Head, 6th Battalion, York & Lancaster Regiment (Goole)
- Lance Corporal H. W. Hendy, 50th Battalion, Machine Gun Corps (Bristol)
- Sergeant J. Hennessey, C/75th Brigade, Royal Field Artillery (Rhymney)
- Sergeant J. Henson, 9th Battalion, Cheshire Regiment (Wandsworth)
- Gunner E. A. Hicks, 456th Siege Battery, Royal Garrison Artillery (Forest Gate, London)
- Sergeant W. Hillyard, 6th Battalion, King's Own Scottish Borderers (Deptford)
- Sergeant G. Hilton, 5th Battalion, Cameron Highlanders (Toronto)
- Company Quartermaster Sergeant D. S. Hobson, 1/5th Battalion, Liverpool Regiment (Liverpool)
- Sergeant G. T. E. Hockaday, Royal Army Service Corps, attd. 79th Siege Battery, Royal Garrison Artillery (Torquay)
- Private A. Hodder, 1st Battalion, Leicestershire Regiment (Loughboro)
- Corporal E. J. Holden, 37th Divisional Signals Company, Royal Engineers (Farnham)
- Staff Sergeant Major F. Hollington, 5th Lancers (Godmanchester)
- Sergeant T. Holloway, 1/6th Battalion, South Staffordshire Regiment, attd. 137th Trench Mortar Battery (Wednesbury)
- Driver G. E. Hooper, C/63rd Brigade, Royal Field Artillery (Fulham)
- Company Sergeant Major R. Hopkins MM 5th Battalion, East Surrey Regiment (Dartford)
- Battery Sergeant Major A. W. Horlock, 286th Siege Battery, Royal Garrison Artillery (Sydenham)
- 2nd Corporal A. A. Horwood, Royal Engineers, attd. 3rd Tank Brigade (Windsor)
- Corporal T. G. Hosker, Labour Corps (late 1/5th Battalion, North Lancashire Regiment) (Bolton)
- Sergeant H. C. Howard, 141st Siege Battery, Royal Garrison Artillery (Eastleigh)
- Corporal R. Howarth, 18th Battalion, King's Royal Rifle Corps (Rochdale)
- Company Sergeant Major J. Howes, 18th Battalion, Lancashire Fusiliers (Chadderton)
- Sergeant S. Howes, 409th Siege Battery, Royal Garrison Artillery (Tulse Hill)
- Sergeant J. Hoyle, 105th Field Company, Royal Engineers (Whalley, Lancaster)
- Regimental Sergeant Major A. R. Hubbert, 2/4th Battalion, Hampshire Regiment (Manchester)
- Sergeant J. H. Huckle D/64th Army Brigade, Royal Field Artillery (Kentish Town)
- Battery Sergeant Major W. Hudson, C/246th (West Riding) Brigade, Royal Field Artillery T.F. (Sheffield)
- Sergeant J. Huggan, 167th A.T. Company, Royal Engineers (Hawick)
- Sergeant J. Hughes, 15th Battalion, Lancashire Fusiliers (Swinton)
- Sergeant G. H. Humber, attd. 38th Brigade, Royal Field Artillery (Newport, Isle of Wight)
- Company Quartermaster Sergeant J. Hunt, 2nd Battalion, Tank Corps (Bolton)
- Sergeant R. Hunter, 128th Battery, 29th Brigade, Royal Field Artillery (Sheffield)
- Sergeant W. J. Hunter, 2/14th Battalion, London Regiment (Harrow)
- Sergeant J. Hurst, B/104th Brigade, Royal Field Artillery (Bootle, Lancaster)
- Sergeant W. R. Hutton, 8th Battalion, West Yorkshire Regiment (Leeds)
- Private P. Hynes, 12th Battalion, Rifle Brigade (Middlesbrough)
- Corporal T. J. Ingram, 260th (Railway) Company, H.E. (Birkenhead)
- Battery Quartermaster Sergeant J. R. Jackman, 37th Divisional Ammunition Column, Royal Field Artillery (Frome)
- Sergeant W. Jacks, Signal Sub-Section, Royal Engineers, attd. 72nd Army Brigade, Royal Field Artillery (Brentwood)
- Sergeant J. Jackson, Military Mounted Police, attd. 3rd Division (Paddington)
- Company Sergeant Major J. A. Jackson, 98th Field Company, Royal Engineers (Mobberley)
- Sergeant T. Jackson, 286th (West Lancaster) Brigade, Royal Field Artillery (Bamber Bridge)
- Sergeant F. T. James, 12th Battalion, East Surrey Regiment (Hounslow)
- Sergeant T. Jarvis, 51st Battalion, Machine Gun Corps (Sheffield)
- Private P. H. Jeans, 6th Battalion, Cameron Highlanders (Inverness)
- Corporal C. Jefferies, 483rd (Royal Artillery) Field Company, Royal Engineers (Brisbane, Aust.)
- Sergeant G. W. Jeffery, D/51st Brigade, Royal Field Artillery (E. Greenwich)
- Sergeant T. Jeffery, D/112th Brigade, Royal Field Artillery (Damdale)
- Gunner W. Jenkins, 87th Siege Battery, Royal Garrison Artillery (Llandybie)
- Signaller Corporal A. Johnson, 64th Battery, 5th A. Brigade, Royal Field Artillery (Glasgow)
- Corporal G. E. Johnson, 2nd Battalion, Lincolnshire Regiment (Marshchapel)
- Corporal J. Johnson, 1/5th Battalion, York & Lancaster Regiment (Rotherham)
- 2nd Corporal L. Johnson, Royal Engineers, attd. 87th Brigade, Royal Garrison Artillery (Baling, London)
- Sergeant J. Johnstone, 13th Battalion, Royal Scots (Margate)
- Temp Regimental Sergeant Major W. Johnstone, 9th Battalion, Durham Light Infantry (Felling-on-Tyne)
- Sergeant F. Jones, T. Battery, 14th Army Brigade, Royal Horse Artillery (Birmingham)
- Corporal I. E. Jones, 140th Field Ambulance, Royal Army Medical Corps (Port Talbot)
- Sergeant J. Jones, 117th Heavy Battery, Royal Garrison Artillery (Llandudno)
- Corporal R. Jones, 14th Battalion, Royal Welsh Fusiliers (Llandudno)
- Sergeant E. Joseph, 1st Battalion, Worcestershire Regiment (Bristol)
- Sergeant H. Judd, Lance 15th Brigade, Royal Horse Artillery (Southampton)
- Corporal A. G. Kay, bth? Battalion, North Staffordshire Regiment (Glasgow)
- Corporal E. Kay, 1st Battalion, Tank Corps (Gateshead)
- Sergeant N. Kehby, 65th Battery, 28th Army Brigade, Royal Field Artillery (Maryborough, Ireland)
- Company Sergeant Major J. A. Kellett, 39th Battalion, Machine Gun Corps (Listerhills)
- Quartermaster Sergeant W. Kelly, 3rd Battalion, Machine Gun Corps (Liverpool)
- Battery Sergeant Major T. Kemp, E. Battery, Royal Horse Artillery (Hampstead)
- Private V. Kempshall, 7/8th Battalion, King's Own Scottish Borderers (Manchester)
- Sergeant J. Kennedy, 183rd Company, Labour Corps (Belfast)
- W. A. Kent, 1/6th Battalion, Manchester Regiment (Kinsale)
- Sergeant F. M. Keogan, C/110th Brigade, Royal Field Artillery (Tow Law, County Durham)
- Gunner T. Kirby, C/276th (West Lancaster) Brigade, Royal Field Artillery (Lancaster)
- Corporal J. Kirk, Sth Battalion, Royal Lancaster Regiment (Coldham)
- Driver H. Kitehen, attd. 46th Brigade, Royal Field Artillery (Huddersfield)
- Sergeant F. Knapp, 2nd Battalion, Scottish Rifles (Hackney Wick)
- Sergeant A. E. J. Knight, 163rd Siege Battery, Royal Garrison Artillery (Brighton)
- Sergeant H. Knight, 2nd Battalion, Royal Dublin Fusiliers, attd. Anson Battalion, Royal Naval Volunteer Reserve (Cork)
- Private J. Knoble, 1st Battalion (now Depot), Royal Scots Fusiliers (Ayr)
- Sergeant G. H. Laing, 19th Battalion, Northumberland Fusiliers (South Shields)
- Sergeant H. T. Lamb, D/153rd Brigade, Royal Field Artillery (Stockwell, London)
- Sergeant T. Lamb, 133rd Heavy Battery, Royal Garrison Artillery (Bootle, Liverpool)
- Company Sergeant Major H. D. B. Land, 4/5th Battalion, Royal Highlanders (Dover)
- Quartermaster Sergeant G. W. Langford, 2/3rd (East Lancaster) Field Ambulance, Royal Army Medical Corps (Manchester)
- Sergeant F. Langham, No. 1 (R. Mon.) Siege Company, Royal Engineers (Hopkinstown)
- Signaller Corporal W. D. Langley, 9th Lancers (Garboldieham)
- Corporal H. G. Latarche, 512th (London) Field Company, Royal Engineers (Stepney Green, London)
- Corporal S. J. Lathwood, 2nd Battalion, London Regiment (Catford)
- Battery Sergeant Major T. Laverick, Royal Field Artillery, attd. 307th (South Midland) Brigade, Royal Field Artillery (Sunderland)
- Company Sergeant Major A. E. Leach MM 2nd Battalion, Grenadier Guards (Wellingboro)
- Sergeant E. J. Lee, 81st Siege Battery, Royal Garrison Artillery (Fulham)
- Company Sergeant Major J. Leedham, 3rd Battalion, Worcestershire Regiment (Birmingham)
- Lance Sergeant T. Leeming, 1/5th Battalion, Lancashire Fusiliers (Adlington)
- Sergeant W. C. Lees, 352nd Siege Battery, Royal Garrison Artillery (Stoke-on-Trent)
- Sergeant R. W. Legg, 493rd Siege Battery, Royal Garrison Artillery (Chaldon, near Dorchester)
- Sergeant P. L. Lelliott, 119th Siege Battery, Royal Garrison Artillery (Hastings)
- Corporal T. Lennox, 110th Heavy Battery, 67th Brigade, Royal Garrison Artillery (E. Glasgow)
- Sergeant A. Leonard MM & Bar 119th Battery, 27th Brigade, Royal Field Artillery (Mildenhall)
- Sergeant E. A. Leverton, 17th Battalion, Machine Gun Corps (Nottingham)
- Sapper A. G. Lewis, 58th (Land.) Divisional Signals Company, Royal Engineers (Leamington Spa)
- Sergeant E. Lewis, C/122nd Brigade, Royal Field Artillery (Cardiff)
- Sergeant F. A. Lewis, 14th Battalion (now depot), Welsh Regiment (Swansea)
- Lance Corporal F. C. V. Lewis, Military Mounted Police, attd. 42nd Division (Tylers Green, near High Wycombe)
- Company Sergeant Major F. E. Lewis, 41st Battalion, Machine Gun Corps (E. Hounslow)
- Sergeant G. W. Lewis, Royal Field Artillery, attd. X/59th Trench Mortar Battery (Chatham)
- Company Sergeant Major H. J. Lewis MM 9th Battalion, Welsh Regiment (Abergavenny)
- Sergeant A. Lilley, 189th Siege Battery, Royal Garrison Artillery (Hebburn, South Shields)
- Sergeant J. H. C. Lindfield, attd. 112th Brigade, Royal Field Artillery (Crawley)
- Corporal A. Lindley, Royal Army Service Corps, attd. 202nd Siege Battery, Royal Garrison Artillery (New Kent Rd, London)
- Company Sergeant Major J. Lindon, 1/7th Battalion, Lancashire Fusiliers (Pendleton)
- Sergeant F. G. Linggood, 24th Battalion, Royal Fusiliers (Walthamstow)
- Corporal J. Lloyd, 2nd Battalion, Lancashire Fusiliers (Liverpool)
- Acting Sergeant J. Lockhart, 9th Battalion, Royal Irish Fusiliers (Belfast)
- Sergeant G. F. Long, 134th A.T. Company, Royal Engineers (Woolwich)
- Sergeant C. Loomes, 1/5th Battalion, Nottinghamshire and Derbyshire Regiment (Chesterfield)
- Company Sergeant Major G. H. Lovett, 1/5th Battalion, Leicestershire Regiment (Loughboro)
- Corporal H. Low, 1/7th Battalion, Argyll and Sutherland Highlanders (Montrose)
- Sergeant H. Lowe, C/59th Brigade, Royal Field Artillery (York)
- Corporal W. Luke, 12/13th Battalion, Northumberland Fusiliers (Broompark, Durham)
- Battery Sergeant Major A. Lunn, 267th Siege Battery, Royal Garrison Artillery (now 2/1st Brigade, South African R.B.) (N. Kensington)
- Company Quartermaster Sergeant J. J. Lynn, 68th Field Company, Royal Engineers (Hyde Park, London)
- Signaller V. Maguire, 28th Battery, 9th Brigade, Royal Field Artillery (Altrincham)
- Sergeant D. O. Main, 50th Divisional Signals Company, Royal Engineers (Hull)
- Sergeant T. F. W. Mallard, 120th Heavy Battery, Royal Garrison Artillery (Duston, near Northampton)
- Corporal A. Malloch, 323rd Siege Battery, Royal Garrison Artillery (Glasgow)
- Private A. Mallook, 1st Battalion, Royal Inniskilling Fusiliers (Dundee)
- Company Sergeant Major B. J. Marlow, 78th Field Company, Royal Engineers (Hounslow)
- Battery Quartermaster Sergeant B. Marmion, 10th Battalion, Scottish Rifles (Liverpool)
- Gunner A. Marriott, C/91st Brigade, Royal Field Artillery (Northampton)
- 2nd Corporal J. S. Marshall, 25th A.T. Company, H.E. (Worcester)
- Quartermaster Sergeant D. G. Martin, 98th Field Ambulance, Royal Army Medical Corps (Liverpool)
- Private L. Mason MM 7th Battalion, East Kent Regiment (Aston, Birmingham)
- Company Sergeant Major W. C. Mason, 19th Battalion, Durham Light Infantry (Shildon)
- Company Sergeant Major G. R. Mathie, 12th Battalion, Royal Scots (Glasgow)
- Company Sergeant Major L. A. Matthews MM 1st Battalion, Gordon Highlanders (Aldershot)
- Sergeant F. May MM 1st Battalion, Royal Fusiliers (Dover)
- Sergeant H. V. May MM 63rd (R.N.) Divisional Signals Company, Royal Engineers (Gosport)
- Sergeant S. W. Maycoek, D/113th Brigade, Royal Field Artillery (Brixton, London)
- Private G. Mays, 14th Battalion, Worcestershire Regiment (Hadfield)
- Sergeant A. McAllister, 14th Company, Labour Corps (Steventon)
- Company Sergeant Major D. McCarthy, 19th Battalion, Welsh Regiment (Cardiff)
- Sergeant T. McCormack, 145th Siege Battery, Royal Garrison Artillery (Ardsallagh, County Waterford)
- Sergeant J. McCullough MM 9th Battalion, Royal Irish Fusiliers (Portadown)
- Company Sergeant Major O. McDermott, 1/6th Battalion, West Riding Regiment (Skipton)
- Company Sergeant Major M. McDonald, 4th Battalion, Seaforth Highlanders (Torridon)
- Battery Sergeant Major C. McDonough, attd. 86th Brigade Royal Field Artillery (Jarrow-on-Tyne)
- Company Sergeant Major W. MacFarlane, 5th Battalion, Cameron Highlanders (Polton, Midlothian)
- Sergeant A. Mcintire, Royal Army Service Corps, attd. 214th Siege Battery, Royal Garrison Artillery (Montrose)
- Sergeant T. B. McIver, 52nd (Lowland) Divisional Signals Company, Royal Engineers (Auchterader)
- Sergeant J. MacKay, 31st Divisional Signals Company, Royal Engineers (Springburn, Glasgow)
- Private G. McKimm, 1st Battalion, Royal Inniskilling Fusiliers (Dover)
- Regimental Sergeant Major G. McLean, 2nd Battalion, King's Own Scottish Borderers (Berwick-on-Tweed)
- Sergeant D. McLeod, B/58th Brigade, Royal Field Artillery (Glasgow)
- Sergeant W. McLeod, C/157th Brigade, Royal Field Artillery (Aberdeen)
- Sergeant P. McNally, 529th (West Riding) Field Company, Royal Engineers (Hull)
- Company Quartermaster Sergeant W. McRae, 1/5th Battalion, King's Own Scottish Borderers (Newton-Stewart)
- Private A. McRobbie, 6th Battalion, Gordon Highlanders (Insch, Aberdeenshire)
- Whlr. J. McWilliam, attd. 251st (N'bn) Royal Field Artillery (Hull)
- Sergeant I. Meadows, 1/12th Battalion, North Lancashire Regiment (St. Helens)
- Corporal A. Mennie, Royal Army Medical Corps, attd. 5/6th Battalion, Royal Scots (Aberdeenshire)
- Lance Corporal A. Menzies MM 6th Battalion, Royal Highlanders (Aberfeldy)
- Sergeant W. Michie, 1st Battalion, King's Own Scottish Borderers (Hawick)
- Corporal E. W. Mildenhall, 11th Battalion, Royal Scots (Clapham)
- 2nd Corporal J. M. Millar, 84th Field Company, Royal Engineers (Broadloan, Renfrew)
- Battery Sergeant Major J. P. Miller, 210th (East Lancaster) Brigade, Royal Field Artillery (Mary Port)
- Acting Regimental Sergeant Major G. Millington, Shropshire Light Infantry, attd. 1/1st Battalion, Herefordshire Regiment (Fordesley, Salop)
- Corporal P. G. Milling, 1st Battalion, Worcestershire Regiment (Weston-Turville, near Tring)
- Battery Sergeant Major A. Mills, 11th Battery, Royal Field Artillery, attd. 315th (Northumberland) Army Brigade (Preston)
- Sergeant W. Mills, attd. 175th Brigade, Royal Field Artillery (Tooting, London)
- Company Sergeant Major V. W. Minter, 208th Field Company, Royal Engineers (Norwich)
- Company Sergeant Major F. Mitchell, 6th Battalion, Cheshire Regiment (Mossley)
- Gunner W. Mitchell, 83rd Battery, Royal Field Artillery, attd. Headquarters, 11th Brigade (Leith)
- Sergeant E. Mogg, 127th Heavy Battery, Royal Garrison Artillery (St. George, Bristol)
- Battery Quartermaster Sergeant W. Moir, 8th Battalion, Royal Highlanders (Montrose)
- Sergeant C. F. Moody MM 8th Battalion, Royal Sussex Regiment (Crofton Park, London)
- Sergeant J. Moore, 5th Battalion, South Wales Borderers (Neath)
- Sergeant J. Morris, 4th Battalion, Middlesex Regiment (Kilburn, London)
- Sergeant T. H. Morris, 2/4th Battalion, Oxfordshire & Buckinghamshire Light Infantry (Oxford)
- Corporal W. Mothershaw, 56th Battalion, Machine Gun Corps (Newcastle)
- Sergeant H. A. Moulden, D/159th Brigade, Royal Field Artillery (Haggerston)
- Sergeant J. Muir, 1/6th Battalion, Argyll and Sutherland Highlanders (Neilston)
- Sapper J. Mullen, 181st Tunnelling Company, Royal Engineers (Wigan)
- Sapper A. Mullin, 4th Field Sur. Company, Royal Engineers (Mitchelstown)
- Company Sergeant Major J. Murray, 1st Battalion, Royal Irish Rifles (Dublin)
- Sergeant L. R. Naimby, 9th Battalion, Northumberland Fusiliers (Seaton Sluce)
- Sergeant J. Naughton, 185th Tunnelling Company, Royal Engineers (Clown, Derby)
- Company Sergeant Major H. Neilson MM 409th (Lowland) Field Company, Royal Engineers (Airdrie)
- Sergeant W. Nelson MM 252nd Tunnelling Company, Royal Engineers (Hexthorpe)
- Company Quartermaster Sergeant L. Neville, 1/7th Battalion, Middlesex Regiment (Hampton Hill)
- Sergeant B. Newman, 12th Battalion, Somerset Light Infantry (Bournemouth)
- Corporal H. Newman, 2nd Battalion, Royal Scots Fusiliers (Brighton)
- Company Sergeant Major J. W. Newman, 2nd Battalion, Manchester Regiment (South Hampstead, London)
- Sergeant A. J. Newnham, 9th Battalion, Royal Sussex Regiment (Dane Hill, Sussex)
- Sergeant P. Nichol, 15/17th Battalion, West Yorkshire Regiment (Leeds)
- Company Quartermaster Sergeant J. Nicholson, 2nd Battalion, East Lancashire Regiment (Blackburn)
- Sergeant J. Noble, Sth Battalion, Seaforth Highlanders (Nairn)
- Corporal A. L. Norman, 7th Battalion, Rifle Brigade, attd. 33rd Battalion, London Regiment (Forest Gate)
- Company Sergeant Major J. Norton, 4th Battalion, Grenadier Guards (Battersea)
- Temp Regimental Sergeant Major A. Oakham, 2/2nd Battalion, London Regiment (Fulham)
- Company Sergeant Major J. O'Brien MM 2nd Battalion, Leinster Regiment (Cork)
- Corporal H. Ormerod, C/157th Brigade, Royal Field Artillery (Burnley)
- Gunner J. Orton, C/148th Brigade, Royal Field Artillery (Newcastle)
- Company Sergeant Major J. Owens, 1st Battalion, attd. 2/7th Battalion, Liverpool Regiment (E. Liverpool)
- Sergeant Major A. Oxley, 136th Field Ambulance, Royal Army Medical Corps (Tinsley)
- Sergeant H. Page, 204th Field Company, Royal Engineers (Saws ton)
- Battery Quartermaster Sergeant H. A. Page, 14th Divisional Ammunition Column, Royal Field Artillery (Faversham)
- Battery Sergeant Major C. Palmer, 255th (Highland) Brigade, Royal Field Artillery (Aberdeen)
- Gunner J. Palmer, attd. 95th Brigade, Royal Field Artillery (Manor Park)
- Private C. J. Parker, 7th Battalion, South Staffordshire Regiment (Birmingham)
- Company Quartermaster Sergeant H. Parker, 1st Battalion, Royal Lancaster Regiment (Ipswich)
- Sergeant J. H. Parker, 66th (East Lancaster) Divisional Ammunition Column, Royal Field Artillery (Burnley)
- Corporal W. E. Parker, 1/6th Battalion, Liverpool Regiment, attd. 165th Trench Mortar Battery (Liverpool)
- Sergeant G. Parkinson, B/295th (North Midland) Brigade, Royal Field Artillery (Boston)
- Company Sergeant Major R. Parry, 1/4th Battalion, Royal Lancaster Regiment (Moston)
- Private H. J. Peacock, 113t Field Ambulance, Royal Army Medical Corps (Stoke-on-Trent)
- Company Sergeant Major A. Pearce, 1st Battalion, Welsh Guards (Bristol)
- Gunner W. Pearson, O/189th Army Brigade, Royal Field Artillery (Heaton Mersey)
- Sergeant H. E. Peet, 17th Battalion, Machine Gun Corps (Peckham)
- Battery Quartermaster Sergeant H. Perkins, 11th Battalion, Royal West Surrey Regiment (Wandsworth)
- Sergeant J. Perkins MM B/122nd Brigade, Royal Field Artillery (Bridgend)
- Signaller D. Pestell, B/92nd Brigade, Royal Field Artillery (Brynmawr)
- Company Quartermaster Sergeant W. Philip, 12th Battalion, Machine Gun Corps (Elgin)
- Battery Quartermaster Sergeant O. J. L. Pidwell, D/190 Brigade, Royal Field Artillery (Exeter)
- Company Sergeant Major G. Pine, 12th Battalion, Gloucestershire Regiment (Bristol)
- Acting Bombardier J. Pinkney MM attd. 112th, Brigade, Royal Field Artillery (Crook)
- Battery Quartermaster Sergeant C. Pitt, 3rd Brigade, Ammn. Column Royal Horse Artillery (Newbridge, County Kildare)
- Temp Regimental Sergeant Major E. C. Pittam, 2/10th Battalion, London Regiment (Woodford Green)
- Company Sergeant Major H. J. Plumb, 1st Battalion, East Surrey Regiment (Putney)
- Sergeant G. H. Pointon, D/155th Brigade, Royal Field Artillery (Retford)
- Corporal P. R. Pontifex, Railway Operating Company, Royal Engineers (Guildford)
- Bombardier A. V. Poole, attd. 62nd Brigade, Royal Field Artillery (King's Lynn)
- Sergeant W. Poole, 2nd Battalion, Middlesex Regiment (Wandsworth)
- Sergeant A. S. Pooley, 251st Tunnelling Company, Royal Engineers (Barncoose)
- Sergeant S. J. Porter, 87th Field Company, Royal Engineers (Plaistow)
- Corporal F. Prentice, Royal Field Artillery, attd. X/12th Medium Trench Mortar Battery (Belfast)
- Sergeant G. D. Price, 1st Battalion, Norfolk Regiment (Poplar)
- Acting Sergeant J. E. Price, 2nd Battalion, Hampshire Regiment (Brading, Isle of Wight)
- Corporal W. J. Price, Sth Railway Company, Royal Engineers (Chatham)
- Company Quartermaster Sergeant W. Pridding, 9th Battalion, Royal Welsh Fusiliers (Holt)
- Sergeant W. Pritchard, attd. 15th Brigade, Royal Field Artillery (Cartridge, near Botley)
- Company Quartermaster Sergeant W. J. C. Proctor MM 2nd Battalion, Seaforth Highlanders (Elgin)
- Gunner W. Puddefoot, attd. 106th Brigade, Royal Field Artillery (East Ham)
- Gunner J. Pybus, 142nd Siege Battery, 34th Brigade, Royal Garrison Artillery (Doncaster)
- Gunner H. C. Ralph, Royal Horse Artillery, attd. HQ 4th Brigade (Caulsdon)
- 2nd Corporal E.Ramsay, 170th Company, Royal Engineers (E. Harrogate)
- Sergeant T. Ratcliffe, 11th Battalion, East Yorkshire Regiment (Nuneaton)
- Corporal J. A. Rate, 3rd Divisional Signals Company, Royal Engineers (Northampton)
- Corporal H. L. Rathbone, 248th Siege Battery, Royal Garrison Artillery (Coseley, near Bilston)
- Sergeant J. Rawlings, 172nd Tunnelling Company, Royal Engineers (Sheffield)
- Acting Battery Sergeant Major Major W. Rawlinson, 75th Brigade, Royal Field Artillery (Rackmansworth)
- Sergeant W. Rayner, 22nd Heavy Battery, Royal Garrison Artillery (Royston)
- Corporal D. J. Reardon, No. 9 A. A. S. Light Section, Royal Engineers (Northfleet, London)
- Private P. A. Reed, 133rd Field Ambulance, Royal Army Medical Corps (Clapham)
- Mech/Staff Sergeant J. Rees, 2nd Battalion, Tank Corps (Abercynon)
- Sergeant L. E. R. Reeve, 27th Battery, 32nd Brigade, Royal Field Artillery (Forest Gate, London)
- Sergeant J. Reid, attd. 77th Army Bda, Royal Field Artillery (Fulham)
- Sergeant J. Rigby, 2/5th Battalion, Lancashire Fusiliers (Ratcliffe)
- Sapper F. Riley, 59th (North Midland) Divisional Signals Company, Royal Engineers (Newcastle, Staffs.)
- Corporal G. H. T. Robbins MM 2nd Battalion, Devonshire Regiment, attd. 23rd Light Trench Mortar Battery (South Molton)
- Company Sergeant Major D. Robertson, 1st Battalion, Tank Corps (Perth)
- Sergeant D. Robertson, 206th Field Company, Royal Engineers (Limarty, Perthshire)
- Sergeant L. Robinson, 74th Divisional Signals Company, Royal Engineers (Liverpool)
- Farrier Staff Sergeant W. Robson, 37th Battery, 27th Brigade, Royal Field Artillery (Stoke Newington, London)
- Sergeant F. Roper, 312th (West Riding) Brigade, Royal Field Artillery (Sheffield)
- Company Sergeant Major A. B. Rose, XV. Corps Cyclist Battalion, Army Cyclist Corps (Oxford)
- Sergeant W. Roskilly, 1st Battalion, Middlesex Regiment (Enfield)
- Sergeant M. Ross, A1/87th Brigade, Royal Field Artillery (Paisley)
- Sergeant J. Rowe, 1st Battalion, Border Regiment (St. Pancras)
- Sergeant S. Rowe, D/161st Brigade, Royal Field Artillery (Tickhill)
- Staff Sergeant Major H. Rowlatt, 4th Dragoon Guards (W. Hartiepool)
- Sergeant J. Roy, 250th TunnellingCompany, Royal Engineers (Windygates, Fifeshire)
- Sergeant H. Royal, 1/5th Battalion, Border Regiment (Brandon, Suffolk)
- Sergeant G. Royle, 17th Battalion, Manchester Regiment (Stockport)
- Company Sergeant Major F. Runcorn, 24th Battalion, Royal Fusiliers (Poplar)
- Sergeant A. J. Runnacles, 46th Battery, 39th Brigade, Royal Field Artillery (N. Finchley)
- Sergeant A. J. Russell MM 129th Battery, Royal Field Artillery (Lewisham, London)
- Gunner C. R. Russell, C/77th Brigade, Royal Field Artillery (Forest Gate, London)
- Battery Sergeant Major A. Sage, C/94th Brigade, Royal Field Artillery (Colchester)
- Private R. Sandford, 11th Battalion, Tank Corps (Barrowford)
- Sergeant W. Savage, 2/4th Battalion, South Lancashire Regiment (Warrington)
- Sergeant E. A. Scarborough, 5th Battalion South Wales Borderers (Eastbourne)
- Corporal T. Scott, 15th Battalion, Royal Irish Rifles, attd. 107th Light Trench Mortar Battery (Dromore, County Down)
- Sergeant H. Scrivener, 2nd Battalion, Northamptonshire Regiment (Barking)
- Sergeant F. W. Scutcher, 37th Battalion, Machine Gun Corps (Beckenham)
- Company Sergeant Major T. U. Selway MC 1st Battalion, Rifle Brigade (Wimborne)
- Sergeant Dr. T. P. Shepherd, 8th Battalion, Royal West Surrey Regiment (Cricklewood)
- Sergeant R. J. Sheringham, 126th Heavy Battery, Royal Garrison Artillery (Guisboro, Yorkshire)
- Sergeant J. W. Sherriff, 20th Battalion, Durham Light Infantry (Elano Lane, County Durham)
- Company Quartermaster Sergeant J. W. Shinn (Railway) Operating Company, Royal Engineers (Munnow, Camb.)
- Sergeant W. Siddle, 18th Battalion, Durham Light Infantry (Sunderland)
- Sergeant W. Sigstone, 39th Battalion, Machine Gun Corps (Malton)
- Company Sergeant Major A. J. Simkins, 4th Battalion, Worcestershire Regiment (Shrewsbury)
- Sergeant J. N. Simmons, 8th Battalion, North Staffordshire Regiment (Brierley Hill)
- Lance Corporal A. Simpson, Military Foot Police (Portsmouth)
- Private T. Simpson, 2/7th Battalion, Royal Warwickshire Regiment (Birmingham)
- Company Sergeant Major G. W. Sismey, 6th Battalion, Northamptonshire Regiment (Old Fletton)
- Company Sergeant Major W. T. Skeer, Royal West Kent Regiment, attd. 2/20th Battalion, London Regiment (Chart)
- Sergeant W. Skinner, 128th Heavy Battery, Royal Garrison Artillery (Sandridge, near St. Albans)
- Private G. A. Skippen, 9th Battalion, Essex Regiment (Chelmsford)
- Sergeant E. H. Skipper, 258th Siege Battery, Royal Garrison Artillery (Hoxton)
- Gunner E. T. Skull, C/311th (West Riding) Army Brigade, Royal Field Artillery (Wootton Bassett)
- Company Sergeant Major C. W. Slater, 1st Battalion, London Regiment (Paddington)
- Company Quartermaster Sergeant F. Slaughter, 4th Battalion, Royal Sussex Regiment (Arundel)
- Sergeant A. Sleight MM 6th Battalion, Lincolnshire Regiment (Scunthorpe)
- Battery Sergeant Major G. S. Sloan, 53rd Battery, 2nd Brigade, Royal Field Artillery (Ballincollie)
- Sergeant W. Slough, 12th Heavy Battery, Royal Garrison Artillery (Brockley)
- Corporal G. E. Smale, 366th Siege Battery, Royal Garrison Artillery (Plymouth)
- Company Sergeant Major A. G. Small, 2nd Battalion, Devonshire Regiment (Wellington)
- Company Quartermaster Sergeant B. J. Smith, 19th Battalion, Machine Gun Corps (Aoton)
- Sergeant E. A. Smith, 4th Battalion, Bedfordshire Regiment (Hemel Hempstead)
- Company Sergeant Major G. Smith, 1/4th Battalion, East Yorkshire Regiment (Wincolmlee)
- Lance Sergeant G. C. Smith, 21st Battalion, Middlesex Regiment (Worcester)
- Signaller Sergeant G. D. Smith, 221st Siege Battery, Royal Garrison Artillery (Tunstall, Suffolk)
- Battery Sergeant Major G. G. Smith MM I. Battery, 7th Brigade, Royal Horse Artillery (Southampton)
- Sergeant H. Smith, C/245th (West Riding) Brigade, Royal Field Artillery (Leeds)
- Whlr. H. Smith, attd. 230th (North Midland) Brigade, Royal Field Artillery (Sutterton, Lincolnshire)
- Gunner H. Smith, attd. 70th Brigade, Royal Field Artillery (Grundisburgli)
- Sergeant H. S. Smith, 8th Battalion, Royal Berkshire Regiment (Kemlworth)
- Sergeant J. Smith, 1/5th Battalion, Manchester Regiment (Eccleshill)
- Driver J. W. Smith, B/296th (North Midland) Brigade, Royal Field Artillery (Peterborough)
- Battery Sergeant Major R. B. Smith, 86th Battery, 32nd Brigade, Royal Field Artillery (Wood Green, London)
- Corporal R. C. Smith, 10th Battalion, Essex Regiment (Market Harborough)
- Sergeant W. Smith, 1/4th Battalion, Leicestershire Regiment (LÈcester)
- Driver W. Smith, 131st Heavy Battery, Royal Garrison Artillery (Herts.)
- Sergeant A. E. Snowden, 234th Field Company, Royal Engineers (Stockton-on-Tees)
- Sergeant T. W. Soulsby, 35th Battalion, Machine Gun Corps (South Shields)
- Company Sergeant Major A. W. Spain, 20th Battalion, King's Royal Rifle Corps (Silvertown, London)
- Private J. F. Spalding, Royal Army Service Corps, attd. 25th (1/2nd Wessex) Field Ambulance, Royal Army Medical Corps (Dumfries)
- Sergeant C. Sparrow, 33rd Battalion, Machine Gun Corps (Newmarket)
- Sergeant W. H. Sparrow, 11th Battalion, Royal West Surrey Regiment (Lowestofit)
- Sergeant J. C. Spence, 2nd Battalion, Coldstream Guards (Bayswater, London)
- Farrier Sergeant W. E. Spencer, 9th Lancers (Blackwater)
- Private T. J. Spooner, 13th Battalion, Royal Welsh Fusiliers (Stoke Newington)
- Leading Seaman T. Stanwix, Hood Battalion, Royal Naval Volunteer Reserve (Silloth)
- Sergeant C. O. Staples, Signal Service, Royal Engineers, attd. Headquarters, 89th Brigade (Wimbley)
- Corporal W. Stebbing, 11th Battalion, Somerset Light Infantry (Great Yarmouth)
- Company Sergeant Major F. Stembridge, 7th Battalion, West Yorkshire Regiment (Leeds)
- Sergeant J. Stephens, 171st Tunnelling Company, Royal Engineers (Manchester)
- Sergeant W. H. Stevens, D/173rd Brigade, Royal Field Artillery (Howden)
- Sergeant W. Stevenson, 1st Battalion, Scots Guards (Bermondsey, London)
- Battery Sergeant Major A. Stewart, attd. 82nd Brigade, Royal Field Artillery (Edinburgh)
- Pioneer W. T. Stirling, E. Spec. Company, Royal Engineers (Bishop Briggs)
- Company Sergeant Major W. Stokes, 1/8th Battalion, Nottinghamshire and Derbyshire Regiment (Old Basford, Nottinghamshire)
- Sergeant L. Stone, 110th Battery, 24th Brigade, Royal Field Artillery (Swanwick)
- Corporal H. R. Stow, 15th Battalion, Yorkshire Light Infantry, attd. 120th Trench Mortar Battery (Sladesgreen, Erith)
- Corporal R. Strachan MM 256th (Highland) Brigade, Royal Field Artillery (Arbroath)
- Sergeant J. C. Stredder, 439th (Cheshire) Field Company, Royal Engineers (Birkenhead)
- Fitter Staff Sergeant K. Stretton, 70th Siege Battery, Royal Garrison Artillery (Fleckney, near Leicester)
- Sergeant T. Strother, 141st A.T. Company, Royal Engineers (Bowsden, Berwick-on-Tweed)
- Corporal G. T. Sturt, 196th Siege Battery, Royal Garrison Artillery (Pevensey Bay)
- Company Quartermaster Sergeant A. A. V. Surnner, 2nd Battalion, Bedfordshire Regiment (Barking)
- Acting Corporal G. E. Swift, J/5th Battalion, South Lancashire Regiment (St. Helens)
- Sergeant W. G. Tallowin, attd. 110th Brigade, Royal Field Artillery (Hackney Wick, London)
- Lance Bombardier T. H. Tarns, B/231st (North Midland) Brigade, Royal Field Artillery (Hanley, Staffs.)
- Corporal W. Tant, 11th Battalion, Essex Regiment (Neasden)
- Corporal F. A. Tarling, 131st Field Ambulance, Royal Army Medical Corps (Aberavooi)
- Acting Lance Corporal A. Taylor, 341st Road Con. Company, Royal Engineers (Dorchester)
- Sergeant H. Taylor, 21st Battalion, West Yorkshire Regiment (Halifax)
- Sergeant Dr. S. W. Taylor, 1st Battalion, North Staffordshire Regiment (Stafford)
- Private W. J. Taylor, 2nd Battalion, Royal Berkshire Regiment (Newbury)
- Lance Bombardier A. Teagle, 102nd Siege Battery, Royal Garrison Artillery (Bedminster)
- Sergeant J. Tenwick, B/117th Brigade, Royal Field Artillery (Blackfriars, London)
- Private G.H. Thomas, 1/6th Battalion, South Staffordshire Regiment (Hednesford)
- Sergeant D. P. Thomas, 9th Battalion, London Regiment (Bayswater)
- Farrier Sergeant A. Thompson, B/91st Brigade, Royal Field Artillery (Bolton)
- Sergeant R. Thompson, Royal Army Service Corps, attd. 71st (S.A.) Siege Battery, Royal Garrison Artillery (Saffron Walden)
- Sergeant T. M. Thompson, 199th Siege Battery, Royal Garrison Artillery (Harehills)
- Corporal G. Thomson, 1/5th Battalion, King's Own Scottish Borderers (Lockerbie)
- Sergeant F. Thorley MM 2nd Battalion, Royal Welsh Fusiliers (Crewe)
- Bombardier H. J. Tinsley, C/71st Brigade, Royal Field Artillery (Nottingham)
- Corporal B. Tongue, 217th Siege Battery, Royal Garrison Artillery (Bristol)
- Sergeant C. W. Topping, 1st Battalion, Scottish Rifles, attd. 19th Trench Mortar Battery (Kentish Town)
- Company Sergeant Major A. Towner, 1st Battalion, Royal West Surrey Regiment (Hackney Wick)
- Company Quartermaster Sergeant H. W. Townsend, 39th Battalion, Machine Gun Corps (Chipping Norton)
- Sergeant J. W. Townsend, 1/4th Battalion, South Lancashire Regiment (Newton-le-Willows)
- Sergeant E. C. Troman MM 2nd Battalion, Royal Welsh Fusiliers (Birmingham)
- Corporal J. M. Turnbull, 184th Tunnelling Company, Royal Engineers (Edinburgh)
- Sergeant B. Turner, 13th Battalion, West Riding Regiment (Chesterfield)
- Battery Sergeant Major C. Turner, D/36th Brigade, Royal Field Artillery (Manchester)
- Battery Sergeant Major J. W. Twilley, C/150th Brigade, Royal Field Artillery (Sheffield)
- Sergeant A. Underwood, C/47th Brigade, Royal Field Artillery (Newport, Yorkshire)
- Corporal G. H. Unsworth, 5th (Royal Anglesey) Field Company, Royal Engineers (E. Beaumaris)
- Company Quartermaster Sergeant A. V. Unwin, 9th Battalion, Royal Welsh Fusiliers (Chirk)
- Sergeant R. Ure, 1st Battalion, Scots Guards (Glasgow)
- Sergeant A. Urquhart, 5th Battalion, Machine Gun Corps (Buckie)
- Sergeant C. Usher, 1/14th Battalion, London Regiment (Highbury Park)
- Sergeant W. E. Vagg, 17th Battalion, Northumberland Fusiliers (York)
- Whlr. Corporal G. H.Vanner, B/162nd Brigade, Royal Field Artillery (Ryde, Isle of Wight)
- Sergeant H. W. Vernon, 2nd Battalion, South Lancashire Regiment (Liverpool)
- Sergeant W. Voisey, B/187th Brigade, Royal Field Artillery (MiUwall)
- Company Sergeant Major A. Waddel, 2nd Battalion, Highland Light Infantry (Portobello)
- Sergeant A. Wager, 13th Battalion, Middlesex Regiment (Wood Green, London)
- Sergeant F. Wain, 2nd Battalion, Irish Guards (Rugeley)
- Private S. Wakefield, 12th Battalion, Norfolk Regiment (Wisbech)
- Battery Sergeant Major A. Wakelin, D/15th Brigade, Royal Field Artillery (Carrgerlane)
- Company Sergeant Major F. Walker, 10th Battalion, Essex Regiment (Walthamstow)
- Bombardier N. Walker, 504th Battery, 65th Brigade, Royal Field Artillery (Macclesfield)
- Private C. J. Wallace, 15th Battalion, Welsh Regiment (Gilfach, Glamorgan)
- Sergeant A. E. Wallington, C/170th Brigade, Royal Field Artillery (West Norwood)
- Sergeant A. C. Walters, 295th (Railway) Company, Royal Engineers (Wokingham)
- Gunner F. T.Walters, 227th Siege Battery, Royal Garrison Artillery (Faversham)
- Sergeant T. E. Walters, 41st Battalion, Machine Gun Corps (Heaton)
- Battery Sergeant Major F. H. Ward, C/83rd Brigade, Royal Field Artillery (Colchester)
- Sergeant J. S. Ward, C/168th Brigade, Royal Field Artillery (Wakefield)
- Sergeant A. Wardle MM 1st Battalion, King's Royal Rifle Corps (Birmingham)
- Gunner F. Wardle, B/311th (West Riding) Brigade, Royal Field Artillery (Brighouse, Yorkshire)
- Company Sergeant Major J. R. Warnchen, 2/17th Battalion, London Regiment (St. George's-in-the-East)
- Battery Sergeant Major J. Warnes, D/286th (West Lancaster) Brigade, Royal Field Artillery (Wickham, Herts.)
- Sergeant H. L. Warren, 1/2nd (London) Heavy Battery, Royal Garrison Artillery (Tufnell Park, London)
- Battery Sergeant Major J. W. Waters, 48th Heavy Battery, Royal Garrison Artillery (Fareham)
- Sergeant W. Waterworth, 427th (East Lancaster) Field Company, Royal Engineers (Ashley, Cheshire)
- Corporal W. Watmough, 66th (East Lancaster) Divisional Signals Company, Royal Engineers (Hulme)
- Company Sergeant Major H. R. W. Watson, 1/5th Battalion, Lancashire Fusiliers (Walker-on-Tyne)
- Company Sergeant Major J. Watts, 56th Battalion, Machine Gun Corps (Buckingham)
- Lance Corporal T. Watts, Military Mounted Police, attd. Headquarters, 34th Division (Chertsey)
- Sergeant J. S. Webster, 147th Siege Battery, Royal Garrison Artillery (Bexhill)
- Sergeant R. Weddell, 5th Battalion, Seaforth Highlanders (Edinburgh)
- Sergeant A. C. Weeks MM 63rd Field Company, Royal Engineers (Southall, Middlesex)
- Sergeant W. S. Weeks MM 2nd Signal Squadron, Royal Engineers (St. Helens, Isle of Wight)
- Sergeant G. Wells, C/51st Brigade, Royal Field Artillery (Stockton)
- Corporal J. Wenman, 29th (1st London) Divisional Signals Company, Royal Engineers (Hawkhurst)
- Corporal A. P. H. Werner, C/153rd Brigade, Royal Field Artillery (Walworth)
- Gunner A. G. Weston, 65th Battery, 28th Army Brigade, Royal Field Artillery (Weedon)
- Sergeant A. J. White, C/48th Army Brigade, Royal Field Artillery (Acorington)
- Sergeant C. White, 212th Siege Battery, Royal Garrison Artillery (Andover)
- Corporal E. White, 17th Battalion, Royal Fusiliers (Shepton Mallet)
- Company Sergeant Major J. White, 47th Battalion, Machine Gun Corps (E. Stirling)
- Private W. White, 12th Battalion, Yorkshire Light Infantry (Harrogate)
- Company Sergeant Major J. Whitfield, 9th Battalion, West Riding Regiment (Peckham)
- Battery Sergeant Major C. E. Whitmill, attd. 76th Army Brigade, Royal Field Artillery (Grimsbury)
- Lance Sergeant W. G. Wickens, 10th Battalion, Royal West Surrey Regiment (Crowborough)
- Fitter Staff Sergeant H. Widdows, 183rd Siege Battery, Royal Garrison Artillery (Blackheath)
- Company Sergeant Major E. A. Wigmore, 58th Battalion, Machine Gun Corps (Highbury)
- Sergeant J. S. Wild, 155th Field Company, Royal Engineers (Glossop)
- Sergeant S. R. Wilding, Royal Garrison Artillery, attd. T. A. A. Battery. (Lower Compton)
- Sergeant J. L. J. Wilkins, 230th A.T. Company, Royal Engineers (Harringay, London)
- Sapper H. E. Wilkinson MM Signal Sub-Section, Royal Engineers, attd. 5th Army Brigade, Royal Field Artillery (Manchester)
- Company Sergeant Major H. Willcock, 42nd (East Lancaster) Divisional Signals Company, Royal Engineers (Cheadle, Manchester)
- 2nd Corporal G. H. Wilier, 86th Field Company, Royal Engineers (Heighton, Sussex)
- Sergeant E. Williams, 4th Battalion, Machine Gun Corps (Penybryn)
- Company Sergeant Major F. T. Williams, 15th Battalion, Hampshire Regiment (Deptford)
- Company Sergeant Major C. W. Willis, 1st Battalion, Duke of Cornwall's Light Infantry (Bodmin)
- Private D. Wilson, 52nd Battalion, Machine Gun Corps (Glasgow)
- Sergeant F. Wilson, 1st Battalion, East Lancashire Regiment (Bradford)
- Sergeant G. Wilson MM 2nd Battalion, Nottinghamshire and Derbyshire Regiment (Ambergate)
- Company Sergeant Major G. H. Wilson, 1/4th Battalion, Shropshire Light Infantry (Shrewsbury)
- Fitter Staff Sergeant H. Wilson, 111th Siege Battery, Royal Garrison Artillery (Leeds)
- Sergeant J. J. Wilson, 37th Battery, 27th Brigade, Royal Field Artillery (Barking)
- Sergeant S. Wilson, 142nd Field Ambulance, Royal Army Medical Corps (Warwick)
- Sergeant F. Windybank, 1st Battalion, Royal Marine Light Infantry (Manchester)
- Bombardier A. Winn, 462nd Battery, 179th Brigade, Royal Field Artillery (Rawdon)
- Fitter Staff Sergeant F. Winson, 114th Siege Battery, Royal Garrison Artillery (Bayswater, London)
- Sergeant J. H. Wood, 1/5th Battalion, Duke of Cornwall's Light Infantry (Bude, Cornwall)
- Corporal T. Wood, 1/7th Battalion, Manchester Regiment, attd. 125th Light Trench Mortar Battery (Manchester)
- Company Sergeant Major A. E. Woodhams, 17th Battalion, King's Royal Rifle Corps (Clapham, London)
- Corporal E. J. Woollen, 1st Field Squadron, Royal Engineers (Rochester)
- Lance Corporal G. H. Woolley, 89th Field Company, Royal Engineers (Worksop)
- Battery Sergeant Major C. W. Workman MM Royal Garrison Artillery, attd. 270th Siege Battery, Royal Garrison Artillery (Gosport)
- Private A. H. Wragg, 4th Field Aonb, Royal Army Medical Corps (Marple, Chester)
- Private A. Wright, 17th Battalion, Royal Sussex Regiment (Painswick, Gloucester)
- Gunner J. Wright, C/56th Brigade, Royal Field Artillery (South Shields)
- 2nd Corporal G. G. Wyatt, 16th Divisional Signals Company, Royal Engineers (Whitchurch, Salop)
- Sergeant E. B. Wynne, 253rd Tunnelling Company, Royal Engineers (Wolstanton)
- Sergeant S. York MM 1st Battalion, Lincolnshire Regiment (Camberwell)
- Lance Corporal E. H. Young, Military Foot Police, attd. Town Commdt., Arras (Paddington)

Canadian Force

- Sergeant C. W. Allbon, 13th Battalion, Canadian Railway Troops
- Company Sergeant Major W. Anderson MM 43rd Battalion, Canadian Infantry
- Sergeant L. W. Armstrong, 58th Battalion, Canadian Infantry
- Sergeant J. Askew, 75th Battalion, Canadian Infantry
- Sergeant D. J. Avison, 31st Battalion, Canadian Infantry
- Corporal E. H. Bennett, 8th A. Brigade, Canadian Field Artillery
- Corporal J. Bird, 46th.Battalion, Canadian Infantry
- Sergeant W. P. Bruce, 2nd Brigade, Canadian Garrison Artillery
- Sergeant L. Bouchard, 52nd Battalion, Canadian Infantry
- Company Quartermaster Sergeant D. Callander, 18th Battalion, Canadian Infantry
- Regimental Sergeant Major T. Carroll, 38th Battalion, Canadian Infantry
- Sergeant W. D. Connell, 58th Broad Gauge Railway Operating Company
- Company Sergeant Major J. L. Davies MM 42nd Battalion, Canadian Infantry
- Sergeant J. W. Bobbie, 54th Battalion, Canadian Infantry
- Sergeant F. Dow, 13th Brigade, Canadian Field Artillery
- Regimental Sergeant Major H. Endall MM 26th Battalion, Canadian Infantry
- Sergeant W. Fettus MM 4th Battalion, Canadian Engineers
- 2nd Corporal G. Fielding, 2nd Canadian Divisional Signals Company, Canadian Engineers
- Sergeant A. I. Fleck, 14th Brigade, Canadian Field Artillery
- Driver W. R. Flinn, 4th Canadian Pont. Brigade, Canadian Engineers
- Sergeant S. Fowler, 25th Battalion, Canadian Infantry
- Company Sergeant Major J. Foy, Royal Canadian Regiment
- Sergeant G. Gardner, 4th Battalion, Canadian Infantry
- Corporal G. W. Gazeley, 1st Canadian Works Company
- Corporal E. W. George MM 29th Battalion, Canadian Infantry
- Lance Sergeant W. A. Gilbert, 1st Battalion, Canadian Mounted Rifles
- Company Sergeant Major W. R. Goodchild, 4th Battalion, Canadian Mounted Rifles
- Sergeant V. Goodman, 4th Battalion, Canadian Machine Gun Corps
- Company Quartermaster Sergeant E. R. Goucher, 5th Battalion, Canadian Engineers
- Battery Quartermaster Sergeant E. Greer, 1st Battalion, Canadian Infantry
- Private E. W. Ball, Canadian Motor Machine Gun Brigade, M.T. Company, Canadian Army Service Corps
- Sergeant G. P. Hearnden, 102nd Battalion, Canadian Infantry
- Battery Quartermaster Sergeant H. Higgins, 6th Brigade, Canadian Field Artillery
- Corporal G. N. Howe, 47th Battalion, Canadian Infantry
- Sergeant D. Hunt, 3rd Battalion, Canadian Railway Troops
- Sergeant D. Irons, 49th Battalion, Canadian Infantry
- Sergeant C. Off. H. Jeeves, 10th Battalion, Canadian Infantry
- Corporal G. H. Johnston, 1st Battalion, Canadian Railway Troops
- Sergeant W. Kemp, 1st Brigade, Canadian Garrison Artillery
- Sergeant D. Kerr, 2nd Battalion, Canadian Engineers
- Battery Quartermaster Sergeant J. H. King, 52nd Battalion, Canadian Infantry
- Private E. T. Lockhart, 10th Canadian Field Ambulance, Canadian Army Medical Corps
- Sergeant S. G. Mallindine, 2nd Canadian Motor Machine Gun Brigade
- Battery Sergeant Major F. R. H. Marshall, 2nd Brigade, Canadian Field Artillery
- Sergeant R. S. Marston, 2nd Battalion, Canadian Mounted Rifles, attd. 1st Ontario Regiment
- Gunner J. A. MacDonald, 9th Brigade, Canadian Field Artillery
- Acting Corporal K. J. McDonald, Canadian Regiment, attd. 3rd Brigade, Canadian Garrison Artillery
- Sergeant T. MacDonald, 87th Battalion, Canadian Infantry
- Sergeant J. H. MacFarlane, 9th Canadian Field Ambulance, Canadian Army Medical Corps
- Sergeant W. B. Mackie, 20th Battalion, Canadian Infantry
- Sergeant J. F. MacLean. 13th Battalion, Canadian Infantry
- Bombardier V. G. Mew, 2nd Canadian Division Trench Mortar Battery
- Battery Quartermaster Sergeant P. J. Murphy, Royal Canadian Horse Artillery
- Sergeant J. R. Murray, 85th Battalion, Canadian Infantry
- Corporal J. Myles, 1st Canadian Division, Trench Mortar Battery
- Sergeant A. Nauffts, 25th Battalion, Canadian Infantry
- Lance Corporal G. W. O'Reilly, Fort Garry Horse
- Sergeant J. C. Parish, 50th Battalion, Canadian Infantry
- Company Sergeant Major W. G. Powers, 58th Battalion, Canadian Infantry
- Army Staff Sergeant H. Ruddick, 1st Battalion, Canadian Machine Gun Corps
- Sergeant H. Russell, 6th Brigade, Canadian Field Artillery
- Sergeant J. B. Rust, 2nd Battalion, Canadian Machine Gun Corps
- Sergeant J. Rycroft MM 3rd Brigade, Canadian Field Artillery
- Acting Staff Sergeant H. Scott, Canadian O.C., attd. 7th Canadian Sge Battery
- Company Sergeant Major F. C. Sims, 78th Battalion, Canadian Infantry
- Private A. B. Smith, 14th Battalion, Canadian Infantry
- Sergeant B. B. Smith, 4th Battalion, Canadian Infantry
- Regimental Sergeant Major W. Smylie, Headquarters, 1st Brigade, Canadian Engineers
- Sergeant F. A. Southcott, 8th A. Brigade, Canadian Field Artillery
- Corporal A. E. Speare, 20th Battalion, Canadian Infantry
- Company Sergeant Major C. Spurgeon, Princess Patricia's Canadian Light Infantry
- Battery Sergeant Major P. H. Stanley, 10th Brigade, Canadian Field Artillery
- Sergeant F. Stock, 3rd Canadian Pont. Brigade, T.U., Canadian Engineers
- Battery Quartermaster Sergeant S. G. Stoddart, 8th Battalion, Canadian Infantry
- Battery Sergeant Major P. Studdert, 4th Brigade, Canadian Field Artillery
- Sergeant L. B. Taylor, E. Battery, Canadian A.A. Craft, Canadian Field Artillery
- Battery Sergeant Major P. Thome MM 2nd Divisional Ammunition Column, Canadian Field Artillery
- Corporal H. Tomlinson, 2nd Canadian Mounted Rifles (B.C.)
- Company Quartermaster Sergeant J. G. Waterfield, 1st Canadian Divisional Signals Company, Canadian Engineers
- Sergeant J. C. Wherrett MM 44th Battalion, Canadian Infantry
- Sergeant J. C. Wilson, 2nd Canadian Mounted Rifles (B.C.)
- Corporal J. Winters, Signal Troops, Canadian Engineers, Canadian Cavalry Brigade
- Sergeant G. A. Young, 72nd Battalion, Canadian Infantry

Australian Force

- Sergeant H. I. Andrews, 4th Battalion, Australian Machine Gun Corps
- Company Sergeant Major H. Anson, 55th Battalion, Australian Infantry
- Staff Sergeant G. R. Asprey, 1st Australian Supp. Det., Australian Army Service Corps
- Private W. H. Baker, 1st Battalion, Australian Machine Gun Corps
- Lance Corporal J. Barrett, 1st Australian Pioneer Battalion
- Sergeant W. H. D. Beadle, 3rd Australian Divisional Ammunition Column, Australian Field Artillery
- Corporal V. J. Bean, 1st Divisional Train, Australian Army Service Corps
- Sergeant W. A. Birchmore, 4th Brigade, Australian Field Artillery
- Company Sergeant Major C. A. Boyd, 1st Australian Divisional Train, Australian Army Service Corps
- Sergeant N. W. Cairns, 37th Battalion, Australian Infantry
- Sergeant W. S. Cannan, 13th Brigade, Australian Field Artillery
- Company Quartermaster Sergeant F. O. Cavanagh, 11th Battalion, Australian Infantry
- Regimental Sergeant Major L. Collins, 14th Battalion, Australian Infantry
- Sergeant T. S. Daniels, 12th A. Brigade, Australian Field Artillery
- Corporal C. Davies, 6th A. Brigade, Australian Field Artillery
- Company Sergeant Major G. L. W. Dfeacon, 7th Battalion, Australian Infantry
- Corporal R. W. Druery, 3rd Battalion, Australian Infantry
- Sergeant R. A. Fuller, 12th Lieutenant Australian Trench Mortar Battery
- Sergeant W. Furniss, 13th Field Artillery Brigade, Australian Field Artillery
- Company Sergeant Major H. W. Furze, 32nd Battalion, Australian Infantry
- Sergeant H. Gillam, 40th Battalion, Australian Infantry
- Sergeant A. L. Greenwood, 45th Battalion, Australian Infantry
- Corporal J. Hall, 7th Lieutenant Australian Trench Mortar Battery
- Corporal C. R. Harvey, 3rd Lieutenant Australian Trench Mortar Battery
- Corporal F. W. T. Helmore, 1st (Med.) Australian Trench Mortar Battery
- Sergeant S. Hooper, 16th Battalion, Australian Infantry
- Regimental Sergeant Major R. Jenkyn, 2nd Brigade, attd. HQ Australian Field Artillery
- Private J. Jensen, 33rd Battalion, Australian Infantry
- Company Sergeant Major F. S. Jones, 54th Battalion, Australian Infantry
- Company Sergeant Major F. G. Jurd, 5th Australian Pioneer Battalion
- Lance Corporal F. C. Kingston, 11th Battalion, Australian Infantry
- Sergeant A. Locke, 3rd A. Brigade, Australian Field Artillery
- Corporal H. D. Lonie, 3rd Australian Phr. Battalion
- Sergeant O. J. Looney, 39th Battalion, Australian Infantry
- Sergeant C. H. Lorking, 53rd Battalion, Australian Infantry
- Company Sergeant Major T. W. Marriott, 50th Battalion, Australian
- Sergeant R. H. Mathews, 30th Battalion, Australian Infantry
- Sergeant D. Macauley, 44th Battalion, Australian Infantry
- Corporal R. McCann, 4th Australian Division M.T. Company, Australian Army Service Corps, attd. 13th Australian Field Ambulance
- Company Sergeant Major T. H. McColl MM 2nd Battalion, Australian Infantry
- Sergeant A. McDonald, 17th Battalion, Australian Infantry
- Sergeant J. M. McDonald, 9th Battalion, Australian Infantry
- Battery Sergeant Major K. W. C. McEntyre, 3rd A. Brigade, Ammunition Column, Australian Field Artillery
- Gunner T. McLean, 14th Field Artillery Brigade, Australian Field Artillery
- Corporal C. O. McLear, 24th Battalion, Australian Infantry
- Company Sergeant Major F. V. McPhee, 34th Battalion, Australian Infantry
- Sergeant F. R. Philpot, 6th Battalion, Australian Infantry
- Company Sergeant Major P. Robertson, 4th Battalion, Australian Infantry
- Sergeant J. C. Ross, 29th Battalion, Australian Infantry
- Sergeant T. Ross, 1st Australian Light Gauge Railway Operating Company, Australian Engineers
- Corporal T. Ryan, 43rd Battalion, Australian Infantry
- Sergeant J. S. H. Semple, 21st Battalion, Australian Infantry
- Corporal A. W. H. Slater, 3rd Australian Divisional Salvage Company, Australian Army Service Corps
- Corporal J. B. Stark, 3rd Australian Medium Trench Mortar Battery, Australian Field Artillery
- Sergeant A. S. Thomson, 1st Tunnelling Company, Australian Engineers
- Sergeant J. R. Trotman, 49th Battalion, Australian Infantry
- Sergeant A. L. Tully MM 3rd Australian Divisional Signals Company, Australian Engineers
- Corporal L. T. Whitmore, 5th Battalion, Australian Machine Gun Corps
- Sergeant F. C. Wicks, 1st Field Company, Australian Engineers
- Sergeant C. C. Wills, 6th A. Brigade, Australian Field Artillery

New Zealand Force

- Sergeant F. Barclay, New Zealand Maori Pioneer Battalion
- Sergeant A. I. Batty, 2nd Battalion, 3rd New Zealand (R.) Regiment
- Sergeant F. H. Clifford, New Zealand Tunnelling Company, New Zealand Engineers
- Corporal A. Dunlop, 2nd Battalion, Otago Regiment
- Sergeant W. L. Free, 1st Battalion, 3rd New Zealand (R.) Regiment
- Sergeant G. Hatch, New Zealand Tunnelling Company, New Zealand Engineers
- Battery Sergeant Major J. P. Joyce, 6th Battery, 2nd A. Brigade, New Zealand Field Artillery
- Corporal E. Kelly, 2nd Battalion, Canterbury Regiment
- Sapper K. B. McLean, New Zealand Tunnelling Company, New Zealand Engineers
- Sergeant A|C. Mills, 1st Battalion, Otago Regiment
- Sergeant T. Muir, 2nd Battalion, Wellington Regiment
- Sergeant W. A. Proctor, 2nd Battalion, Auckland Regiment
- Private F. A. Stade, New Zealand Machine Gun Corps
- Sergeant J. Tannahill, 1st Battalion, Wellington Regiment
- Sergeant N. B. Thompson, 1st Battalion, Canterbury Regiment
- Sergeant L. Tribe, 1st Battalion, Auckland Regiment
- Sergeant C. Wilson, 1st Battalion, 3rd New Zealand

South African Force

- Company Quartermaster Sergeant M. King, 2nd Battalion, South African Infantry
- Sergeant W. N. Sinclair MM 74th R. Siege Battery, Royal Garrison Artillery (South African Horse Artillery)

Newfoundland Force

- Acting Company Quartermaster Sergeant W. Haynes, 1st Battalion, R. (R.) Royal Newfoundland Regiment

=== Awarded a Bar to the Distinguished Conduct Medal (DCM*) ===
In connection with Military Operations with the Armies in France:

- Sergeant J. S. Bastick DCM 7th Battalion, Norfolk Regiment, attd. 35th Trench Mortar Battery (Bethnal Green)
- Company Sergeant Major F. A. Savage DCM 8th Battalion, Gloucestershire Regiment (Thrupp)
- Sergeant A. Wilbur DCM 1/5th Battalion, Leicestershire Regiment (Hinckley)

Australian Imperial Force

- Sergeant S. Collett DCM 58th Battalion, Australian Infantry
- Company Sergeant Major J. McD. McCash, DCM 59th (late 60th) Battalion, Australian Infantry
